= Neo-Brittonic =

Language family

- Region: Great Britain, Brittany
- Ethnicity: Britons
- Era: c. mid-6th century CE to the present day
- Language family: Indo-European: Celtic; Insular Celtic; Brittonic; Neo-Brittonic

Language codes
- ISO 639-3: –
- Linguist List: brit
- Glottolog: None
- Linguasphere: 50-AB

Neo-Brittonic, also known as Neo-Brythonic, is a stage of the Insular Celtic Brittonic languages that emerged by the middle of the sixth century CE. Neo-Brittonic languages include Old, Middle and Modern Welsh, Cornish, and Breton, as well as Cumbric.

== History ==
Neo-Brittonic emerged out of Late Brittonic around the middle of the sixth century CE. It is marked by the loss of Brittonic final syllables (apocope) and the eventual loss of compositional vowels in compound words (syncope) among other features, such as vowel shift (notably quantity collapse with the lengthening of short stressed vowels before short consonants), vowel affection, lenition of internal consonants, and the development of complex system of grammatical mutations.

The initial stage of the Neo-Brittonic, from around the middle of the sixth century CE to the emergence of Old Welsh, Old Cornish, and Old Breton by the ninth century CE has been termed Common Archaic Neo-Brittonic by Celticist John T. Koch. Documents written in Neo-Brittonic languages (or non-Brittonic documents containing Neo-Brittonic onomastic material, primarily written in Latin or Old English) during this time are scarce, but seem to show a pre-dialectal state in which the Southwestern Brittonic languages (Cornish and Breton) had not yet significantly diverged from Western Brittonic languages (Welsh and Cumbric), though differences may have been masked by scribes across the Neo-Brittonic world using a common orthography dating to an earlier period.

=== Apocope ===
One of the most notable changes in the language was the mid-sixth century loss of Brittonic final syllables of words in a process called apocope. Apocope was due partially to Brittonic penultimate stress access and resulted in the change of inflection type from synthetic to partially analytic.

Brittonic final syllables, which were used to mark grammatical gender and case, likely began to erode much earlier than the sixth century, judging from the evidence of Brittonic's cousin language, Gaulish, in which the final consonants already began to disappear in writing by the 3rd-4th centuries CE.

Loss of final syllable in Common Archaic Neo-Brittonic*wiros “man”
Case	Common Brittonic	Common Archaic Neo-Brittonic	Old Welsh	Modern Welsh
Nom. Masc. Sg.	*wiros	*wur	g[u]ur	gwr
Nom. Masc. Pl.	*wirī	*wīr	guir	gwyr

=== Syncope ===
Syncope (the loss of internal, unstressed vowels) in Late Brittonic and early Neo-Brittonic primarily affected the compositional vowel in unstressed syllables of compound nouns directly before stressed syllables (stress fell on the penultimate syllable in Brittonic and the final syllable in Neo-Brittonic, after the completion of apocope).

Loss of compositional vowels in Common Archaic Neo-Brittonic*Cuno-belinos “Strong Hound/Warrior”
Case	Common Brittonic	Common Archaic Neo-Brittonic	Old Welsh	Modern Welsh
Nom. Masc. Sg.	*Cunobelinos	*Cunbelin	Cinbelin	Cynfelyn

== Bibliography ==
- Ball, Martin J. and Müller, Nichole [eds.] (2015), The Celtic Languages, 2nd ed., New York: Routledge; ISBN 0-203-88248-2.
- Evans, D. Ellis. (1990) Insular Celtic and the emergence of the Welsh language, in: Bammesberger, Alfred, Wollmann, Alfred [eds.], Britain 400-600. Language and History, Heidelberg, C. Winter, pp. 149–177
- Falileyev, Alexander, and Morfydd E. Owen. (2005). The Leiden leechbook. A study of the earliest Neo-Brittonic medical compilation, Innsbrucker Beiträge zur Kulturwissenschaft, Sonderheft 122, Innsbruck: Institut für Sprachen und Literaturen der Universität Innsbruck.
- Jackson, Kenneth H. (1953), Language and History in Early Britain, Edinburgh University Press.
- Koch, John T. (1997), The Gododdin of Aneirin. Text and context from Dark-Age North Britain, Cardiff: University of Wales Press.
- Koch, John. (1989), Neo-Brittonic Spirants from Old Celtic Geminates, Ériu 40, pp. 119–28.
- Koch, John T (1985–6), When was Welsh Literature First Written Down?, Studia Celtica 20/21, pp. 43–66.
- Russell, Paul (2014), An Introduction to the Celtic Languages, Routledge.
- Schrijver, Peter (1995), Studies in British Celtic Historical Phonology, Rodopi.
- Sims-Williams, Patrick (2003), The Celtic Inscriptions of Britain: Phonology and Chronology, c. 400–1200; Oxford, Blackwell; ISBN 1-4051-0903-3.
- Sims-Williams, Patrick, Sims-Williams, P. (1990). Dating the Transition to Neo-Brittonic: Phonology and History, 400-600. In A. Bammesberger, & A. Wollmann (Eds.), Britain 400-600: Language and History. (Vol. 205, pp. 217–261). (Anglistische Forschungen). Heidelberg: Universitaetsverlag Winter.
- Ternes, Elmar [ed.] (2011), Brythonic Celtic – Britannisches Keltisch: From Medieval British to Modern Breton; Bremen: Hempen Verlag.
