= Western Brittonic languages =

Branch of Brittonic containing Welsh and Cumbric

Western Brittonic
- Geographic distribution: Wales; formerly western England, Northern England and Scotland
- Linguistic classification: Indo-European: Celtic; Insular Celtic; Brittonic; Western Brittonic
- Subdivisions: Cumbric †; Welsh

Language codes
- Glottolog: None
- Notes: 6th–present day

Western Brittonic languages (Welsh: Brythoneg Gorllewinol) comprise two dialects into which Common Brittonic split during the Early Middle Ages; its counterpart was the ancestor of the Southwestern Brittonic languages. The reason and date for the split is often given as the Battle of Deorham in 577, at which point the victorious Saxons of Wessex essentially cut Brittonic-speaking Britain in two, which in turn caused the Western and Southwestern branches to develop separately. Southwestern Brittonic later became the ancestor to Cornish and Breton.

According to this categorisation, Western Brittonic languages were spoken in Wales, western England and the Hen Ogledd, or "Old North", an area of northern England and southern Scotland. One Western language evolved into Old Welsh and later modern Welsh language; the language of yr Hen Ogledd, Cumbric, became extinct around 13th century due to assimilation by Gaelic culture and language. Cumbric is sometimes considered to be only a dialect of Old Welsh rather than a separate language, but it still contains notable features and differences, such as the loss of /w/ or retention of Brittonic *rk.

Linguist Alan James has suggested a contrary model where Cumbric and Pictish were more closely aligned to one another than they were to Welsh. Pictish is often considered a Pritenic language, though some theories might view it as a Western Brittonic language.
