= Cumbric =

Extinct Brittonic language of northern England and southern Scotland

- Native to: Kingdom of Strathclyde
- Region: Northern England & Southern Scotland
- Extinct: 13th century
- Language family: Indo-European: Celtic; Insular Celtic; Brittonic; Western Brittonic?; Cumbric

Language codes
- ISO 639-3: xcb
- Glottolog: None
- Linguistic division in early twelfth century Scotland.

Cumbric is an extinct Celtic Brythonic language or dialect that was spoken during the Early Middle Ages in the Hen Ogledd or "Old North", in what is now Northern England and the southern Scottish Lowlands. Place-name evidence suggests Cumbric may also have been spoken as far south as Pendle and the Yorkshire Dales. The prevailing view is that it became extinct in the 12th century, around the incorporation of the Kingdom of Strathclyde into the Kingdom of Scotland.

Linguists are undecided as to whether to classify Cumbric as a dialect of Old Welsh or as a separate language. Koch calls it a dialect but goes on to say that some of the place names in the Cumbric region "clearly reflect a developed medieval language, much like Welsh, Cornish or Breton".

== History ==
=== Date of extinction ===
It is impossible to give an exact date of the extinction of Cumbric. However, there are some pointers which may give a reasonably accurate estimate. In the mid-11th century, some landowners still bore what appear to be Cumbric names. Examples of such landowners are Dunegal (Dyfnwal), lord of Strathnith or Nithsdale; Moryn (Morien), lord of Cardew and Cumdivock near Carlisle; and Eilifr (Eliffer), lord of Penrith.

There is a village near Carlisle called Cumwhitton (earlier Cumquinton). This appears to contain the Norman name Quinton, affixed to a cognate of the Welsh cwm, meaning valley. There were no Normans in this area until 1069 at the earliest.

In the Battle of the Standard in 1138, the Cumbrians are noted as a separate ethnic group. Given that their material culture was very similar to their Gaelic and Anglian neighbours, it is arguable that what set them apart was still their language. Also the castle at Castle Carrock (Castelcairoc) dates from around 1160–1170. Barmulloch, earlier Badermonoc (Cumbric "monk's dwelling"), was given to the church by Malcolm IV of Scotland between 1153 and 1165.

A more controversial point is the surname Wallace. It means "Welshman". It is possible that all the Wallaces in the Clyde area were medieval immigrants from Wales, but given that the term was also used for local Cumbric-speaking Strathclyde Welsh, it seems equally, if not more, likely that the surname refers to people who were seen as being "Welsh" due to their Cumbric language.

Surnames in Scotland were not inherited before 1200 and not regularly until 1400. Sir William Wallace (known in Gaelic as Uilleam Breatnach – namely William the Briton or Welshman) came from the Renfrew area – itself a Cumbric name. Wallace slew the sheriff of Lanark (also a Cumbric name) in 1297. Even if he had inherited the surname from his father, it is possible that the family spoke Cumbric within memory in order to be thus named.

There are also some historical pointers to a continuing separate ethnic identity. Prior to being crowned king of Scotland in 1124, David I was invested with the title Prince of the Cumbrians. William the Lion between 1173 and 1180 made an address to his subjects, identifying the Cumbrians as a separate group. This does not prove that any of them still spoke Cumbric at this time.

The legal documents in the Lanercost Cartulary, dating from the late 12th century, show witnesses with Norman French or English names, and no obvious Cumbric names. Though these people represent the upper classes, it seems significant that by the late 12th century in the Lanercost area, Cumbric is not obvious in these personal names. In 1262 in Peebles, jurymen in a legal dispute over peat cutting also have names which mostly appear Norman French or English, but possible exceptions are Gauri Pluchan, Cokin Smith and Robert Gladhoc, where Gladhoc has the look of an adjectival noun similar to Welsh "gwladog" = "countryman". In the charters of Wetherall Priory near Carlisle there is a monk called Robert Minnoc who appears as a witness to 8 charters dating from around 1260. His name is variously spelled Minnoc/Minot/Mynoc and it is tempting to see an equivalent of the Welsh "mynach" – "Robert the Monk" here.

Given that in other areas which have given up speaking Celtic languages, the upper classes have generally become Anglicised before the peasantry, it is not implausible that the peasantry continued to speak Cumbric for at least a little while after. Around 1200 there is a list of the names of men living in the area of Peebles; Amongst them are Cumbric names such as Gospatrick: servant or follower of Saint Patrick, Gosmungo: servant of Saint Mungo, Guososwald: servant of Oswald of Northumbria and Goscubrycht: servant of Cuthbert. Two of the saints – Oswald and Cuthbert — are from Northumbria showing influence on Cumbric not found in Welsh.

In 1305 Edward I of England prohibited the Leges inter Brettos et Scottos. The term Brets or Britons refers to the native, traditionally Cumbric speaking people of southern Scotland and northern England.

It seems that Cumbric could well have survived into the middle of the 12th century as a community language and even lasted into the 13th on the tongues of the last remaining speakers. Certain areas seem to be particularly dense in Cumbric place-names even down to very minor features. The two most striking of these are around Lanercost east of Carlisle and around Torquhan south of Edinburgh. As mentioned, two or three names from Peebles cited in 1262 may contain traces of Cumbric elements, but there is no evidence for (or against) the continued use of Cumbric language as a vernacular at this time.

== Problems with terminology ==
Dauvit Broun sets out the problems with the various terms used to describe the Cumbric language and its speakers. The people seem to have called themselves *Cumbri the same way that the Welsh called themselves Cymry (most likely from reconstructed Brittonic *kom-brogī meaning "fellow countrymen") and their land Cymru. The Welsh and the Cumbric-speaking people of what are now southern Scotland and northern England probably felt they were actually one ethnic group. Old Gaelic speakers called them "Britons", Bretnach, or Bretain. The Norse called them Brettar. The terms Cymru and Cumbri were rendered in Latin as Cambria and Cumbria, respectively. In Medieval Latin, the English term Welsh became Wallenses ("of Wales"), while the term Cumbrenses referred to Cumbrians ("of Cumbria"). However, in Scots, a Cumbric speaker seems to have been called Wallace – from the Scots Wallis/Wellis "Welsh".

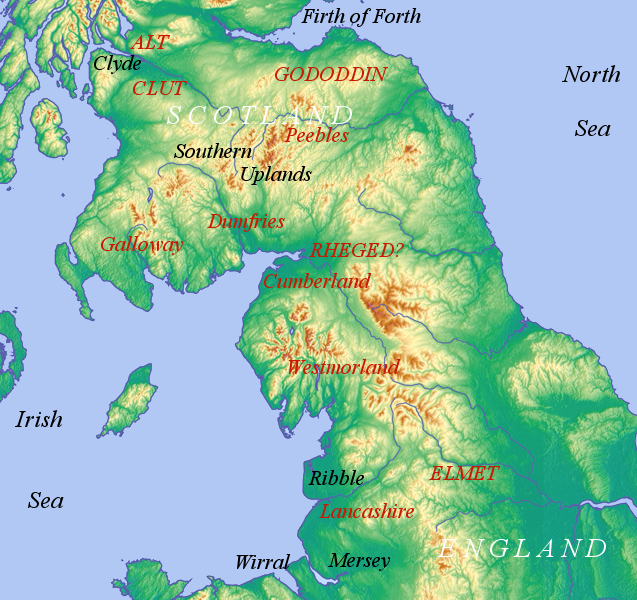
The Cumbric region: modern counties and regions with the early medieval kingdoms

In Cumbria itaque: regione quadam inter Angliam et Scotiam sita – "And so in Cumbria: a region situated between England and Scotland".

The Latinate term Cambria is often used for Wales; nevertheless, the Life of St Kentigern (c. 1200) by Jocelin of Furness has the following passage:

When King Rederech [Rhydderch Hael] and his people had heard that Kentigern had arrived from Wallia [i.e. Wales] into Cambria [i.e. Cumbria], from exile into his own country, with great joy and peace both king and people went out to meet him.

John T. Koch defined the specifically Cumbric region as "the area approximately between the line of the River Mersey and the Forth-Clyde Isthmus", but went on to include evidence from the Wirral Peninsula in his discussion and did not define its easterly extent. Kenneth H. Jackson described Cumbric as "the Brittonic dialect of Cumberland, Westmorland, northern Lancashire, and south-west Scotland" and went on to define the region further as being bound in the north by the Firth of Clyde, in the south by the River Ribble and in the east by the Southern Scottish Uplands and the Pennine Ridge. The study Brittonic Language in the Old North by Alan G. James, concerned with documenting place- and river-names as evidence for Cumbric and the pre-Cumbric Brittonic dialects of the region Yr Hen Ogledd, considered Loch Lomond the northernmost limit of the study with the southernmost limits being Liverpool Bay and the Humber, although a few more southerly place-names in Cheshire and, to a lesser extent, Derbyshire and Staffordshire were also included.

== Available evidence ==
The evidence from Cumbric comes almost entirely through secondary sources, since no known contemporary written records of the language survive. The majority of evidence comes from place names of the north of England and the south of Scotland. Other sources include the personal names of Strathclyde Britons in Scottish, Irish, and Anglo-Saxon sources, and a few Cumbric words surviving into the High Middle Ages in southwest Scotland as legal terms. Although the language is long extinct, traces of its vocabulary arguably have persisted into the modern era in the form of "counting scores" and in a handful of dialectal words.

From this scant evidence, little can be deduced about the singular characteristics of Cumbric, not even the name by which its speakers referred to it. However, linguists generally agree that Cumbric was a Western Brittonic language closely related to Welsh and, more distantly, to Cornish and Breton.

Around the time of the battle described in the poem Y Gododdin, c. 600, Common Brittonic is believed to have been transitioning into its daughter languages: Cumbric in North Britain, Old Welsh in Wales, and Southwestern Brittonic, the ancestor of Cornish and Breton. Kenneth Jackson concludes that the majority of changes that transformed British into Primitive Welsh belong to the period from the middle of the fifth to the end of the sixth century. This involved syncope and the loss of final syllables. If the poem ultimately dates to this time, it would have originally been written in an early form of Cumbric, the usual name for the Brythonic speech of the Hen Ogledd; Jackson suggested the name "Primitive Cumbric" for the dialect spoken at the time. However, scholars date the poem to between the 7th and the early 11th centuries, and the earliest surviving manuscript of it dates to the 13th, written in Old Welsh and Middle Welsh.

=== Place names ===
Cumbric place-names occur in Scotland south of the firths of Forth and Clyde. Brittonic-looking names north of this line are Pictish. Cumbric names are also found commonly in the historic county of Cumberland and in bordering areas of Northumberland. They are less common in Westmorland, east Northumberland, and Durham, with some in Lancashire and the adjoining areas of North and West Yorkshire. Approaching Cheshire, late Brittonic placenames are probably better characterised as Welsh rather than as Cumbric. As noted below, however, any clear distinction between Cumbric and Welsh is difficult to prove. Many Brittonic place-names remain in these regions which should not be described as Cumbric, such as Leeds, Manchester, Wigan and York, because they were coined in a period before Brittonic split into Cumbric and its sister dialects.

Some of the principal towns and cities of the region have names of Cumbric origin, including:

- Bathgate, West Lothian: meaning 'boar wood' (Welsh baedd 'wild boar' + coed 'forest, wood').
- Bryn, Metropolitan Borough of Wigan: from the word meaning "hill" (W. bryn).
- Carlisle, Cumberland: recorded as Luguvalium in the Roman period; the word caer 'fort' was added later. The Welsh form Caerliwelydd is derived by regular sound changes from the Romano-British name.
- Glasgow, Scotland: widely believed to derive from words cognate with glas 'green' and the Welsh gae, 'field' (possibly that below Glasgow Cathedral).
- Lanark, Lanarkshire: from the equivalent of Welsh llannerch 'glade, clearing'.
- Penicuik, Midlothian: from words meaning 'hill of the cuckoo' (W. pen y gog).
- Penrith, Westmorland & Furness: meaning 'chief ford' (Welsh pen 'head, chief' + rhyd 'ford').

Several supposed Cumbric elements occur repeatedly in place names of the region. The following table lists some of them according to the modern Welsh equivalent:

Element (Welsh)	Celtic root	Meaning	Place names	Reconstructed Cumbric form
blaen	*blagno-	end, point, summit; source of river	Blencathra, Blencogow, Blindcrake, Blencarn, Blennerhassett, Plenmeller	*blayn
caer	castrum (Latin)	fort, stronghold; wall, rampart	Carlisle, Carluke, Cardew, Cardurnock, Carfrae, Cargo, Carlanrig, Carriden, Castle Carrock, Cathcart, Caerlaverock, Cardonald, Cramond, Carleith	*cayr
coed	*keto-	trees, forest, wood	Alkincoats, Bathgate, Dalkeith, Culgaith, Tulketh, Culcheth, Pencaitland, Penketh, Towcett, Dankeith, Culgaith, Cheadle, Cheetham, Cathcart, Cheetwood, Cathpair, Kincaid, Inchkeith	*cɛ̄d
cwm	*kumba-	deep narrow valley; hollow, bowl-shaped depression	Cumrew, Cumwhitton, Cumwhinton, Cumdivock	*cumm
drum, trum	*drosman-	ridge	Drumlanrig, Dundraw, Mindrum, Drumburgh, Drem, Drumaben	*drümm
eglwys	ecclesia (Latin)	church	Ecclefechan, Ecclesmachan, Eccleston, Eccles, Terregles, Egglescliffe, Eggleshope, Ecclaw, Ecclerigg, Dalreagle, Eggleston, Exley, possibly Eaglesfield	*eglēs
llannerch	*landa-	clearing, glade	Barlanark, Carlanrig, Drumlanrig, Lanark[shire], Lanercost	*lannerch
moel	*mailo-	bald; (bare) mountain/hill, summit	Mellor, Melrose, Mallerstang, Watermillock	*mɛ̄l
pen	*penno-	head; top, summit; source of stream; headland; chief, principal	Pennygant Hill, Pen-y-Ghent, Penrith, Penruddock, Pencaitland, Penicuik, Penpont, Penketh, Pendle, Penshaw, Pemberton, Penistone, Pen-bal Crag, Penwortham, Torpenhow	*penn
pren	*prenna-	tree; timber; cross	Traprain Law, Barnbougle, Pirn, Pirncader, Pirniehall, Pirny Braes, Primrose, Prendwick	*prenn
tref	*trebo-	town, homestead, estate, township	Longniddry, Niddrie, Ochiltree, Soutra, Terregles, Trabroun, Trailtrow, Tranent, Traprain Law, Traquair, Treales, Triermain, Trostrie, Troughend, Tranew; possibly Bawtry, Trafford	*trev
rhos	*ɸrostos	promontory, headland, moor	Melrose, Primrose, Roose, Rosslyn, Rosside, Rosgill	*ros
du	*dubus	dark, black, deep	Glendue, Cardew, Dye, Dipple, Glendowlin	*düv
bre	*brigā	hill, height, fort	Mellor, Carfrae, Mallerstang, Plenmeller	*βre
mynydd	*moniyos	mountain, elevation	Mendick, Maelmin, Mindrum, Minto, Moniefoot, Menybrig, Mindork	*mǝnıð

Some Cumbric names have historically been replaced by Scottish Gaelic, Middle English, or Scots equivalents, and in some cases the different forms occur in the historical record.

- Edinburgh occurs in early Welsh texts as Din Eidyn and in medieval Scottish records as Dunedene (Gaelic Dùn Èideann), all meaning 'fort of Eidyn'.
- Falkirk similarly has several alternative medieval forms meaning 'speckled church': Eglesbreth etc. from Cumbric (Welsh eglwys fraith); Eiglesbrec etc. from Gaelic (modern Gaelic eaglais bhreac); Faukirk etc. from Scots (in turn from Old English fāg cirice).
- Kirkintilloch began as a Cumbric name recorded as Caerpentaloch in the 10th century, but was partly replaced by the Gaelic words ceann 'head' + tulach 'hillock' later on (plus kirk 'church' from Scots again).
- Kinneil derives from Gaelic ceann fhàil 'head of the [Antonine] Wall' but it was recorded by Nennius as Penguaul (Welsh pen gwawl), and by Bede as Peanfahel, which appears to be a merger of Cumbric and Gaelic.

Derivatives of Common Brittonic *magno, such as Welsh maen and Cornish men, mean "stone", particularly one with a special purpose or significance. In the Cumbric region, the word "Man" frequently occurs in geographical names associated with standing stones (most notably the Old Man of Coniston) and it is possible, albeit "hard to say" according to Alan G. James, if the Cumbric reflex *main had any influence on these.

=== Counting systems ===
Among the evidence that Cumbric might have influenced local English dialects are a group of counting systems, or scores, recorded in various parts of northern England. Around 100 of these systems have been collected since the 18th century; the scholarly consensus is that these derive from a Brittonic language closely related to Welsh. Though they are often referred to as "sheep-counting numerals", most recorded scores were not used to count sheep, but in knitting or for children's games or nursery rhymes. These scores are often suggested to represent a survival from medieval Cumbric, a theory first popularized in the 19th century. However, later scholars came to reject this idea, suggesting instead that the scores were later imports from either Wales or Scotland, but in light of the dearth of evidence one way or another, Markku Filppula, Juhani Klemola, and Heli Paulasto posit that it remains plausible that the counting systems are indeed of Cumbric origin.

Cumbric, in common with other Brythonic languages, used a vigesimal counting system, i.e. numbering up to twenty, with intermediate numbers for ten and fifteen. Therefore, after numbering one to ten, numbers follow the format one-and-ten, two-and-ten etc. to fifteen, then one-and-fifteen, two-and-fifteen to twenty. The dialect words for the numbers themselves show much variation across the region.

Counting systems of possible Cumbric origin; modern Welsh, Cornish, and Breton included for comparison.
Number	Keswick	Westmorland	Eskdale	Millom	High Furness	Wasdale	Teesdale	Swaledale	Wensleydale	Ayrshire	Modern Welsh	Modern Cornish	Modern Breton
1	yan	yan	yaena	aina	yan	yan	yan	yahn	yan	yinty	un	onan, unn	unan
2	tyan	tyan	taena	peina	taen	taen	tean	tayhn	tean	tinty	dau m, dwy f	dew m, diw f	daou m, div f
3	tethera	tetherie	teddera	para	tedderte	tudder	tetherma	tether	tither	tetheri	tri m, tair f'	tri m, teyr f	tri m, teir f
4	methera	peddera	meddera	pedera	medderte	anudder	metherma	mether	mither	metheri	pedwar m, pedair f (nasal mhedwar)	peswar m, peder f	pevar m, peder f
5	pimp	gip	pimp	pimp	pimp	nimph	pip	mimp[h]	pip	bamf	pump	pymp	pemp
6	sethera	teezie	hofa	ithy	haata	—	lezar	hith-her	teaser	leetera	chwech	hwegh	c'hwec'h
7	lethera	mithy	lofa	mithy	slaata	—	azar	lith-her	leaser	seetera	saith	seyth	seizh
8	hovera	katra	seckera	owera	lowera	—	catrah	anver	catra	over	wyth	eth	eizh
9	dovera	hornie	leckera	lowera	dowa	—	horna	danver	horna	dover	naw	naw	nav
10	dick	dick	dec	dig	dick	—	dick	dic	dick	dik	deg	deg	dek
15	bumfit	bumfit	bumfit	bumfit	mimph	—	bumfit	mimphit	bumper	—	pymtheg	pymthek	pemzek
20	giggot	Jiggot	—	—	—	—	Jiggit	Jigget	jiggit	—	ugain	ugens	ugent

=== Scots and English ===
A number of words occurring in the Scots language and Northern English dialects have been proposed as being of possible Brittonic origin. Ascertaining the real derivation of these words is far from simple, due in part to the similarities between some cognates in the Brittonic and Goidelic languages and the fact that borrowing took place in both directions between these languages.

Another difficulty lies with other words which were taken into Old English, as in many cases it is impossible to tell whether the borrowing is directly from Brittonic or not (e.g. Brogat, Crag, below). The following are possibilities:

- Bach – 'cowpat' (cf. Welsh baw 'dung', Gaelic buadhar)
- Baivenjar – 'mean fellow' (Welsh bawyn 'scoundrel')
- Brat – 'apron'. The word appears in Welsh (with meanings 'rag, cloth' and 'pinafore'), Scots and northern English dialects, but may be an Old English borrowing from Old Irish.
- Brogat – a type of mead (Welsh bragod 'bragget' – also found in Chaucer)
- Coble – a type of small, flat-bottomed boat (also in Northeast England), akin to Welsh ceubal 'a hollow' and Latin caupulus; distinct from the round-bottomed coracle.
- Crag – 'rocks'. Either from Brittonic (Welsh craig) or Goidelic (Scottish Gaelic creag).
- Croot – 'small boy' (Welsh crwt, Gaelic cruit 'small person', 'humpback/hunchback')
- Croude – a type of small harp or lyre (as opposed to the larger clàrsach; Welsh crwth 'bowed lyre', later 'fiddle', Gaelic croit)
- Lum – Scottish and Northern English word for 'chimney' (Middle Welsh llumon)

== Equivalence with Old Welsh ==
The linguistic term Cumbric is defined according to geographical rather than linguistic criteria: that is, it refers to the variety of Brittonic spoken within a particular region of North Britain and implies nothing about that variety except that it was geographically distinct from other varieties. This has led to a discussion about the nature of Cumbric and its relationship with other Brittonic languages, in particular with Old Welsh.

Linguists appear undecided as to whether Cumbric should be considered a separate language, or a dialect of Old Welsh. Koch calls it a dialect but goes on to say that some of the place names in the Cumbric region "clearly reflect a developed medieval language, much like Welsh, Cornish or Breton". Jackson also calls it a dialect but points out that "to call it Pr[imitive] W[elsh] would be inaccurate", so clearly views it as distinct in some meaningful respect.

It has been suggested that Cumbric was more closely aligned to the Pictish language than to Welsh, though there is considerable debate regarding the classification of that language. On the basis of place name evidence it has also been proposed that all three languages were very similar, but Pictish is more often seen as a language of a branch, separate from Brittonic, known as Pritenic. The "Cumbric" of Lothian plausibly more nearly resembled the "Pictish" of adjacent Fife than the Welsh dialects spoken over 300 miles away in Dyfed. Alan G. James has suggested that Cumbric was a combination between unique Pictish and Brittonic dialect continuum, spoken to the north and south of Cumbria. Below, differences of Cumbric from Old Welsh are discussed:

=== Retention of Brittonic *rk ===
In Welsh, Cornish, and Breton, the Common Brittonic cluster *rk was spirantized to /rx/ (Welsh rch, Cornish rgh, Breton rc'h) but a number of place names appear to show Cumbric retained the stop in this position. Lanark and Lanercost are thought to contain the equivalent of Welsh llannerch 'clearing'.

There is evidence to the contrary, however, including the place names Powmaughan and Maughanby (containing Welsh Meirchion) and the word kelchyn (related to Welsh cylch). Jackson concludes that the change of Common Brittonic *rk > /rx/ "may have been somewhat later in Cumbric".

=== Retention of Brittonic *mb ===
There is evidence to suggest that the consonant cluster mb remained distinct in Cumbric later than the time it was assimilated to mm in Welsh, Cornish, and Breton. The cluster remains in:

- Old English Cumbraland "land of Cumbrians" (from Common Brittonic *kombrogi, whence Welsh Cymru "Wales" also originates).
- Crombocwater and Crombokwatre, two 14th-century records of Crummock Water and Crombok an 1189 record for Crummack Dale in Yorkshire (from Common Brittonic *Crumbāco- "curved one" (W crwm "curved")).
- Cam Beck, the name of a stream in north Cumbria recorded as Camboc (1169) and believed to be from Common Brittonic *Cambāco- "crooked stream" (W cam, CB kamm).
- Crimple Beck, Yorkshire, which is said to derive from Common Brittonic. *Crumbopull- "crooked pool". Here the b is assumed to have survived late enough to cause provection.
- Cambus (1236) for Cambois, Northumberland, said to be from British *camb-asto- ("a bend in a river") (cf. Cemaes, Anglesey).

Jackson notes that only in the north does the cluster appear in place names borrowed after circa 600AD and concludes that it may have been a later dialectal survival here.

=== Syncope ===
Jackson notes the legal term galnys, equivalent to Welsh galanas, may show syncope of internal syllables to be a feature of Cumbric. Further evidence is wanting, however.

=== Devoicing ===
James mentions that devoicing appears to be a feature of many Cumbric place names. Devoicing of word final consonants is a feature of modern Breton and, to an extent, Cornish. Watson notes initial devoicing in Tinnis Castle (in Drumelzier) (compare Welsh dinas 'fortress, city') as an example of this, which can also be seen in the Cornish Tintagel, din 'fort'. Also notable are the different English names of two Welsh towns named Dinbych ('little fort'); Denbigh and Tenby.

There is also a significant number of place names which do not support this theory. Devoke Water and Cumdivock (< Dyfoc, according to Ekwall) and Derwent (< Common Brittonic Derwentiō) all have initial /d/. The name Calder (< Brit. *Caletodubro-) in fact appears to show a voiced Cumbric consonant where Welsh has Calettwr by provection, which Jackson believes reflects an earlier stage of pronunciation. Jackson also notes that Old English had no internal or final /ɡ/, so would be borrowed with /k/ by sound substitution. This can be seen in names with c, k, ck (e.g. Cocker < Brittonic *kukro-, Eccles < Brittonic eglēsia).

=== Loss of /w/ ===
The Cumbric personal names Gospatrick, Gososwald and Gosmungo meaning 'servant of St...' (Welsh, Cornish, Breton gwas 'servant, boy') and the Galloway dialect word gossock 'short, dark haired inhabitant of Wigtownshire' (W. gwasog 'a servant') apparently show that the Cumbric equivalent of Welsh and Cornish gwas & B gwaz 'servant' was *gos. Jackson suggests that it may be a survival of the original Proto-Celtic form of the word in –o- (i.e. *uɸo-sto).

This idea is disputed by the Dictionary of the Scots Language; and the occurrence in Gospatrick's Writ of the word wassenas 'dependants', thought to be from the same word gwas, is evidence against Jackson's theory. Koch notes that the alternation between gwa- and go- is common among the Brittonic languages and does not amount to a systematic sound change in any of them.

Thomas Clancy opined that the royal feminine personal name in Life of Kentigern, Languoreth, demonstrates the presence of /ɡw/ in Cumbric.

It is noteworthy that the toponym Brenkibeth in Cumberland (now Burntippet; possibly bryn, "hill" + gwyped, "gnats") may display this syllable anglicized as -k-. The name, however, may not be Brittonic at all, and instead be of Scandinavian origin.

=== Development of /ɬ/ ===
Ekwall and John Garth Wilkinson argue that some place-names show forms attempting to represent the voiceless alveolar lateral fricative, equivalent to Welsh Ll.

- Polthledick (Cumberland), a tributary of the River Irthing recorded in the 13th century, with -thled- representing a form of Welsh llaid ("mud, mire").
- Trailflat (Dumfriesshire), near Tinwald, which contains the same element as above.
- Worsley (City of Salford), Wirkedley (1219), possibly derived from the equivalent of Welsh celli ("coppice, holt").

Similarly, Peter Drummond (2005) speculated that the form Penthland for the Pentland Hills, which appears on a 16th century atlas by Dutch cartographer Joan Blaeu, represents the same phoneme. However, due to a paucity of corroborating forms, this may be an engraving error, perhaps influenced by Dutch phonology.

=== Development of /t/ ===
Max Förster (1921) and Eilert Ekwall (1928) noted that in certain place-names of Brittonic origin, where the expected development of Proto-Celtic *t in word-final position is to -d, several place-names attest -th instead. A cognate of Welsh coed ("woods, forest") (< Old Welsh coit < PrCel *kaitos), for example, is said to appear in names such as Culcheth (Warrington), Culgaith (Cumberland) and Dalkeith (Midlothian), all attesting final -th. This is paralleled in many examples of names with the same element in Pictland, such as Keith (Banffshire). Kenneth Jackson (1953) saw this as evidence that 'primitive Cumbric' may have diverged from more southern varieties of Brittonic in regard to this phoneme.

Some place-names show evidence to the contrary. Bathgate (West Lothian), Blenkett (Cartmell) and †Rosket (Wigan) show the coed element in -t. Whalley (2021) argues that it is possible that the -th ending may, rather than being a distinct Northern Brittonic feature, have been the result of language contact with Gaelic, Old English and Old Norse.

=== Semantics of Penn ===
In the Book of Aneirin, a poem entitled "Peis Dinogat" (possibly set in the Lake District of Cumbria), contains a usage of the word penn "head" (attached to the names of several animals hunted by the protagonist), that is unique in medieval Welsh literature and may, according to Koch, reflect Cumbric influence ("[r]eferring to a single animal in this way is otherwise found only in Breton, and we have no evidence that the construction ever had any currency in the present-day Wales"). The relevant lines are:

Pan elei dy dat ty e vynyd
Dydygei ef penn ywrch penn gwythwch penn hyd
Penn grugyar vreith o venyd
Penn pysc o rayadyr derwennyd

Translated as:

When your father went to [the] mountain
He brought a head of buck, head of wild pig, head of stag
Head of speckled grouse from [the] mountain
Head of fish from [the] falls of Derwent

However, such semantics are probably archaisms, and rather than being features diagnostic of linguistic distinctiveness, are more likely to be legacies of features once common to all Brittonic speech and the form derwennydd is at odds with the absence of the ending -ydd noted below, as well as the current form Derwent.

=== Definite article ===
The modern Brittonic languages have different forms of the definite article: Welsh yr, -'r, y, Cornish an, and Breton an, ar, al. These are all taken to derive from an unstressed form of the Common Brittonic demonstrative *sindos, altered by assimilation (compare the Gaelic articles). Throughout Old Welsh the article is ir (or -r after a vowel), but there is evidence in Cumbric for an article in -n alongside one in -r. Note the following:

- Tallentire, Cumbria (Talentir 1200–25): 'brow/end of the land' (Welsh tal y tir)
- Treesmax, Ayrshire (Treyvinax: 1500): 'town of the edge' (Welsh tref yr ochr)
- Triermain, Cumbria (Trewermain, Treverman c 1200): 'homestead at the stone' (Welsh tre(f) y maen)
- Treales, Lancashire (Treueles 1086): possibly 'village of the court' (Welsh tre(f) y llys). But note Treflys, Powys which has no article.
- Pen-y-Ghent, Yorkshire (Penegent 1307): 'hill of the border country' (Welsh pen y gaint). The final element is disputed. Ekwall says it is identical to Kent (< Br *Kantion), which is related to Welsh cant 'rim, border', though Mills gives 'coastal district' or 'land of the hosts or armies' for the county.
- Traquair, Borders (Treverquyrd 1124): 'homestead on the River Quair' (Welsh tre(f) y Quair).
- Penicuik, Midlothian (Penicok 1250): 'hill of the cuckoo' (Welsh pen y cog)
- Liscard, Wirral Peninsula (Lisenecark 1260): possibly 'court of the rock' (Welsh llys y garreg), but also suggested is Irish lios na carraige of identical meaning.

Alan G. James has noted that in several place-names with the article in -n, it precedes a dental stop, where -n- > -r may have been inhibited or reversed. Furthermore, all instances of this form of the article are in areas where Gaelic influence may be suspected (cf. Irish and Scottish Gaelic an).

=== Absence of -ydd ===
The normal development of Proto-Celtic -j- in Neo-Brittonic was to -ð- (e.g. PrCelt *moniyos > Welsh mynydd ("mountain")).

Of all the names of possible Cumbric derivation, few are more certain than Carlisle and Derwent which can be directly traced back to their Romano-British recorded forms Luguvalium and Derventio.

The modern and medieval forms of Carlisle (Luel c1050, Cardeol 1092, Karlioli c1100 (in the Medieval Latin genitive case), Cærleoil 1130) and Derwent (Deorwentan stream c890 (Old English), Derewent) suggest derivations from Br *Luguvaljon and *Derwentjō. But the Welsh forms Caerliwelydd and Derwennydd are derived from alternative forms *Luguvalijon, *Derwentijō which gave the -ydd ending. This appears to show a divergence between Cumbric and Welsh at a relatively early date.

If this was an early dialectal variation, it cannot be applied as a universal sound law, as the equivalent of W mynydd 'mountain' occurs in a number of Cumbric names with the spirant intact: E.g. Mindrum (Minethrum 1050) from 'mountain ridge' (Welsh mynydd trum). It might also be noted that Medieval Welsh forms of Caerliwelydd and Derwennydd both occur in poems of supposed Cumbrian origin whose rhyme and metre would be disrupted if the ending were absent.

Of additional relevance is that Guto Rhys demonstrated "some robust proof" of the presence of the -ydd ending in the potentially closely aligned Pictish language. There are also some exceptions to this sound change in Breton, including pri ("soil"), the cognate of Welsh pridd.

=== Use of the name element Gos- ===
One particularly distinctive element of Cumbric is the repeated use of the element Gos- or Cos- (W. gwas 'boy, lad; servant, attendant') in personal names, followed by the name of a saint. The practice is reminiscent of Gaelic names such as Maol Choluim "Malcolm" and Gille Crìosd "Gilchrist", which have Scottish Gaelic maol (Old Irish máel 'bald, tonsured; servant') and gille ('servant, lad', < Old Irish gilla 'a youth').

The most well-known example of this Cumbric naming practice is Gospatric, which occurs as the name of several notable Anglo-Scottish noblemen in the 11th and 12th centuries. Other examples, standardised from original sources, include Gosmungo (Saint Mungo), Gososwald (Oswald of Northumbria) and Goscuthbert (Cuthbert).

=== Vowels ===
In Welsh, Cornish and Breton, proto-Brythonic /*ɛ̄/ and /*ē/ developed into rounded diphthongs. While the development of these vowels in Cumbric is unclear, Whalley argues evidence that rounding occurred in Cumbric is very limited. The sounds usually occur as ⟨e⟩ in place names (e.g. Dalkeith, Culcheth) with /*ɛ̄/ occasionally appearing as ⟨ai⟩ in late names (e.g. Culgaith, Kincaid).

Regarding evidence to the contrary, Whalley notes that 'Plenploth' (recorded as Plenploif in 1593) may contain *pluiv 'parish', possibly demonstrating a shift from /*ē/ to /*ui/. However, Whalley further notes the numerous instances of *eglēs ‘church’ throughout the Cumbric region, which preserve /*ē/ (cf. Old Welsh eccluys). Similarly, while Watson derives the place names Knockcoid, Wigtonshire and Knockycoid, Ayrshire from *cɛ̄d 'wood', Whalley points to the lack of rounding in potentially late names in Cumberland, adding that it is 'rather suspicious' that both that *coid forms lie in the region of earliest Gaelic influence in the South-West of Scotland.

There is some evidence that Brythonic /*ū/ was fronted but retained its rounding in Cumbric—this would explain instances such as Culgaith, Culcheth which may contain Br. *cūlo- ‘nook’ and the early reference to Dunbar as Dyunbær.

== See also ==
- Cumbrian dialect
- Cumbrian toponymy
- Kenneth H. Jackson
- Kingdom of Strathclyde
- Yan tan tethera
