= Pritenic =

Proposed Scottish Celtic language

- (uncertain)
- Region: Scotland, Ireland
- Ethnicity: Picts, Priteni
- Era: c. 1st century AD to 5th century AD; Developed into Pictish after 5th century AD
- Language family: Indo-European: Celtic; Insular Celtic; Pritenic

Language codes
- ISO 639-3: –
- Glottolog: None

Pritenic is a proposed reconstructed Celtic language (or a branch of languages), thought to be spoken by Picts and Priteni in Britain during late Iron Age. It was a P-Celtic language and the ancestor of Pictish, into which it evolved around 5th century AD. The term was originally proposed in 1955 by linguist Kenneth H. Jackson to describe a hypothetical Roman-era (1st to 5th centuries) predecessor to the Pictish language, diverging from Brythonic in 75-100 AD.

== Overview ==
Aside from the original approach of Jackson (also supported by Koch), several linguists made their own opinion on the idea of Pritenic. Linguist Alan G. James noted some phonological and lexical similarities between Cumbric place-names in northern England and southern Scotland and Pictish toponyms to the north of Forth, and argued that the term "Pritenic" was helpful to describe such distinctive features. He listed several elements from the reconstructed language, including aber (compare Welsh aber 'confluence'), brïnn (Welsh bryn, 'hill'), cömber (Welsh cymmer 'confluence'), lanerc (compare Welsh llannerch 'glade'), peth (Brythonic *peθ 'thing'). In Allan's view, Cumbric was seen as a combination of West Brythonic to the south and Pritenic to the north.

Other scholars, like Paul Cavill and George Broderic, referred to Pritenic as "northern P-Celtic" inside a dialect continuum of Proto-P-Celtic, existing on the same level as Proto-Brittonic. They also mentioned a distinctive feature of Pritenic (and Pictish) – o-grade, which creates *abbor instead of *aber, or *ochel instead of *uchel, found in the Scottish toponymy initially by Jackson.

== Evidence ==
The Ptolemaic map is considered the most useful source for evidence of Pritenic. Several names on the map, such as Epidii, indicate that the language was indeed P-Celtic. However, historian Katherine Forsyth stated that "we have no way of proving that locals were Pritenic rather than Brittonic" and that some names on the map might be corrupted. She also acknowledged clear presence of Pre-Celtic, and that some names, such as Ituna, Alauna or Damnonii, show similarities with Gaulish.

One of the most accepted classifications, based on P-Celtic hypothesis, looks like:

- Proto-P-Celtic
  - Brittonic
    - Neo Brittonic languages
  - Pritenic
    - Pictish
  - Gaulish

== Criticism ==
Some scholars criticise the Pritenic hypothesis. In 2015, linguist Guto Rhys stated that most proposals that Pictish diverged from Brittonic before c. 500 AD were incorrect, questionable, or of little importance, and that a lack of evidence to distinguish Brittonic and Pictish rendered the term Pritenic "redundant". In the end of his article, Guto concluded, that Pictish can possibly be "just a dialect of Brythonic". Previously, in 2012, Rhys seemingly agreed with the view of Allan James that Pritenic "is valid" and "should not be abandoned". Similarly, Katherine Forsyth stated that Brythonic and Pritenic are "united by far more than divides them," and that connections with Gaulish are overplayed.

== See also ==
- Pictish language
- Picts
- Brittonic languages
