= Valued Components in Canada =

Valued Components (VC), also referred to as Valued Ecosystem Components (VEC), are used in Environmental Impact Assessment (EIA) to evaluate a proposed projects potential effects. VCs are elements of the natural or human environment used by proponents, the public, governmental agencies, Indigenous groups and scientists to identify, assess, and prioritize environmental, social, cultural, economic, or health elements that may be affected by a proposed project and are considered important or valuable. Focusing on specific VCs within EIA structures addresses the most important and/or impactful elements of a project.

Evaluating VCs enables EIA to identify whether a project is likely to cause significant adverse effects. If a project is deemed to have significantly adverse effects, the project either needs to propose sufficient mitigation or the project may not move forward. Having a comprehensive list that details the most important components of a project under investigation can therefore focus the study area.

VCs are a central part of Impact Assessment (IA), Cumulative Effects Management (CEM) and other processes related to environmental planning and management. VCs are a standard process in IA, however individual VC selection is not standardized. The selection of VCs are context-specific, and there may not be a single clear cause-and-effect relationship between each VC and the effect.

== Types of Valued Components ==
The selection of Valued Components varies depending on the nature and setting of the project. Industry and geographic region can reflect the nature of the potential project effects, as well as the environmental, economic, social, heritage, and health context in which the project is undertaken. Valued Components are vast and are included in circumstances when they are deemed relevant to the study of the project. Common VCs categories and examples include:

Biological Valued Components:

- Physical and meteorological environment
- Soil and soil productivity
- Biodiversity
- Vegetation
- Fish and fish habitat
- Wetlands
- Air emissions
- Greenhouse gas emissions
- Water quality and quantity
- Species at risk and their habitats
- Acoustic environment
- Wildlife and wildlife habitat

Economic Valued Components:

- Economy
- Employment
- Tourism

Social Valued Components:

- Impacts on safety
- Aesthetics quality
- Community infrastructure services (including emergency, protective and education services)
- Human rights (Indigenous peoples may be affected disproportionately by projects, including women children and diverse gender identities)
- Recreation
- Land and resource use
- Navigable waters
- Transportation
- First Nations traditional land and resource use
- Population and demographic community changes

Heritage Valued Components:

- Archaeological and heritage resources
- Interference with cultural or heritage sites
- Impacts on Indigenous communities’ ability to hunt, fish, and gather

Health Valued Components:

- Human health
- Community Health and Wellbeing
- Ecological health

== Identification of Valued Components ==
The selection process of VCs for a project begins with the creation of a comprehensive list of all potential environmental and social attributes that are relevant to the proposed project. The list of VCs become condensed through the process of scientific research and professional judgement to determine which VCs are appropriate for the scope of the project. The selected VCs are analyzed to determine the limits of acceptable change.

=== Spatial Boundaries of Valued Components ===
The proponent establishes three spatial boundaries to assess the effects of each individual Valued Component

- VCs within the Project Area, the project area is otherwise described as the project footprint which includes all temporary or permanent areas associated to the project
- VCs within the Local Study Area, an area beyond the project footprint that is still impacted by the Valued Components
- VCs within the Regional Study Area, which is defined as the area larger than the local study area including regions where cumulative effects might occur, in cases the regional study area may pertain to effects occurring outside of Canadian jurisdiction.

=== Temporal Boundaries for Valued Components ===
The timeframes over which project effects are assessed. Proponents are expected to establish temporal boundaries that include all phases of the project. This may include the construction, operation, and decommissioning of the project, as well as the longer-term timeframes that include potential cumulative effects, which may extend beyond the project’s lifecycle.

== Selection Process for Valued Components in BC ==
Within the identification of Valued Components there are three critical steps that need to be undertaken. The first step includes identifying candidate VCs, the next step is to evaluate those candidate VCs, followed by the final selection process of the evaluated VCs.

The government of British Columbia has a list of questions that help determine whether the Valued Components are relevant to the assessment. These questions help focus the assessment to reduce the amount of resources needed for component consideration. As per the Government of Canada document, the questions include:

- Is the component present in the local or regional project area?
- Does the project have the potential to interact with and adversely affect the component?
- Does a legally binding government requirement (regulation, management framework) exist to protect the component?
- Does the component reflect a legislative or regulatory requirement or government management priority (e.g., species at risk)?
- Does the component pertain to Indigenous interests, including claimed or proven Indigenous rights and treaty rights?
- Is there potential for significant adverse cumulative effects? What known stressors are already occurring on the land base?
- Is the component itself, or the potential adverse effects, of particular concern to the public, Indigenous groups, or government?
- Is the component particularly sensitive or vulnerable to disturbance?
- Can the potential effects of the project on the VC be measured and monitored?
- Is the candidate Valued Component better represented by another VC?
- Can the potential effects on the candidate VC be effectively considered within the assessment of another VC?
- Is information about the candidate VC needed to support the assessment of potential effects on another VC?

== History of Valued Components ==
In the 1970s during the early stages of Environmental Assessment (EA) in North America the process of EA required investigating a vast number of potentially undesirable project impacts. This was a time-consuming and resource intensive task.

Valued Ecosystem Components were introduced in Canada in the early 1980s to focus project- specific EIA . In 1983, Gordon Beanlands and Peter Duinker recommended VECs as a method to avoid the ‘count everything’ approach that characterized early impact assessment, opting for selecting components of greater importance.

Decades following Valued Ecosystem Components slowly shifted away from being focused on ecological components to a broader concept expanded to include social, cultural, health and economic related elements.

Under Canadian Environmental Assessment Act 2012 (CEAA 2012), the proponents of a project are required to assess environmental effects of their project. This includes the analysis of Valued Components as they relate to section 5 of CEAA 2012. The Analysis of VCs includes the ones identified in section 6.2 of CEAA 2012 that may be affected by changes in the environment. Proponents are also required by section 79 of the species at risk Act to outline VCs as the pertain to species at risk and their habitat.

Valued Components now play a more centralized role in environmental assessment in Canada.

== Critiques of Valued Components ==
Valued Components have become a foundational part of the Environmental Assessment process in Canada. However, criticisms have been highlighted in academic research surrounding VCs.

- Research has found that quantitative thresholds used to determine whether impacts on Valued Components are significant are rarely applied. Fewer than 10% of VCs are evaluated using defined thresholds, and even when these thresholds are exceeded, impacts are often still classified as non-significant based on qualitative reasoning.
- A lack of transparency has also been noted in the selection of VCs, particularly in the criteria and rationale used to guide decision-making.

Research has also noted deficiencies in Indigenous Engagement in VC selection, Particularly:

- Limited recognition and meaningful inclusion of Indigenous perspectives, interests, and values has been identified as a concern in the assessment of Valued Components.
- A poor integration of Indigenous and local knowledge
- A lack of time, combined with limited resources interferes with the adequate participation, hindering VC collection.
