= Eccleston =

Eccleston may refer to:

== Places in England ==
- Eccleston, Cheshire
- Eccleston, Lancashire
  - Eccleston Quarry
- Eccleston, St Helens, Merseyside (historically in Lancashire)

== People ==
- Amanda Eccleston (born 1990), American middle-distance runner
- Charles H. Eccleston (active from 2001), American environmentalist
- Christopher Eccleston (born 1964), English actor
- Inez Maria Eccleston, birthname of Inez M. Haring (1875–1968), US botanist
- John Eccleston, British puppeteer
- Joseph Eccleston (1754–1811), American planter, soldier, and politician
- Nathan Eccleston (born 1990), English footballer
- Samuel Eccleston (1801–1851), American archbishop
- Thomas of Eccleston, thirteenth century English Franciscan chronicler
- Tom Eccleston (1910–2000), American ice hockey coach
- Tommy Eccleston (1875–1946), English footballer

== See also ==
- Great Eccleston, Lancashire
- Little Eccleston-with-Larbreck, Lancashire
- Ecclestone (surname)
- Eggleston
