= New Quantity System =

Ancient changes to Celtic languages

The New Quantity System, or the Great British Vowel Shift, was a radical restructuring of the phonological system of the Common Brittonic language which occurred sometime after the middle of the first millennium AD, resulting in the collapse of the early Brittonic system of phonemic vowel length oppositions, which was inherited from Proto-Celtic, and its replacement by a system in which the formerly allophonic qualitative differences between long and short vowels is phonemicized, and vowel length becomes allophonic, and is determined by stress and syllable structure.

== Date ==
Kenneth Jackson dates the New Quantity System to about 600 AD. Kim McCone, noting that the process took quite a long time, dates it to some point in the seventh century.

== Motivation ==
Jackson points out the similarities between this system and the vowel length changes in Vulgar Latin, and describes the Brittonic New Quantity System as "the result of a re-arrangement of the syllabic division."

John Morris-Jones argued that it developed to compensate for the loss of final syllables, "for the lengthening of short vowels originated at the time of the loss of the ending, and is due to compensation for that loss."

McCone describes the new system as a case of what Martinet termed 'isochrony', "the condition that arises from the elimination of the phonemic feature of vowel length...the end result is always a situation in which the length of every vowel in a sequence basically depends upon phonematic or prosodic environment and one may surmise that isochrony is regularly arrived at through the lengthening of certain originally short vowels that had become too short for their environment and through the shortening of other originally long vowels that had become too long for the checked or unaccented syllables in which they occur."

McCone argues that, following phonetic changes in early Brittonic long vowels, "the resultant system of long vowels with the hitherto essentially unchanged set of five short vowel phonemes reveals some reduction in the role of length as a distinctive feature." This was followed by significant shifts in the realization of short vowel phonemes, causing vowel length to first become less relevant, then eventually "phonemically redundant", and finally "synchronically predictable throughout"

== Rules ==
In Late Common Brittonic, before the stress accent shifted from the final syllable to the penultimate syllable, the New Quantity System operated as follows, with few exceptions:

- vowels are long in stressed final syllables if they are in word-final position or before a single lenis consonant.
- vowels are short before fortis or geminate consonants, and consonant clusters.

This means that there is not necessarily any agreement between vowel length in early and late Common Brittonic:

- In stressed syllables, early Brittonic short vowels become long when final or before lenis consonants:
  - e.g. early Brittonic *sĕnŏs 'old' > late Brittonic *hen [heːn]
- In any syllable, early Brittonic long vowels become short before fortis, geminate, or groups of consonants:
  - e.g. early Brittonic *wīskā 'clothing' > late Brittonic *wisk [wisk].
- Originally long vowels may remain long if they comply with the above rules:
  - e.g. early Brittonic *sīrŏs 'long' > late Brittonic *hir [hiːr]
- Similarly, short vowels may remain short:
  - e.g. early Brittonic *pĕnnŏn 'head' > late Brittonic *penn [penː]

Jackson argues that the vowel in unstressed (penultimate) syllables must have been short, even before single lenis consonants, but Peter Schrijver argues that it seems possible that quantitative differences could occur in this position.

== Later changes ==
Following the accent shift in polysyllables from the final to the penultimate syllable around the eleventh century, which apparently occurred independently and simultaneously in Old Welsh, Old Cornish, and Old Breton, the now unstressed vowel in final syllables of polysyllabic words became or remained short, and geminate consonants in final syllables were simplified. The now stressed vowel in penultima in polysyllables became either long (as in Modern Breton) or half-long (as in Modern Welsh), unless followed by a fortis or geminate consonant, or a consonant cluster. Stressed vowels in monosyllables remained long.
