= Southwest British =

South[-]west[ern] British may refer to:

- South West England, one of the nine official regions of England (which is, in part, the most southwesterly of the constituent countries of modern Great Britain)
  - South West England (European Parliament constituency)
- Southwest Britain, a vague generic term for various historical regions including the West Country, Wessex, and Dumnonia (in order of most to least recent)
- Southwestern Brittonic languages
