= Halltree =

Village in Scottish Borders, Scotland

Coordinates: 55°45′34″N 2°56′01″W

Halltree is a hamlet in the Scottish Borders.

== Etymology ==
The etymology of Halltree is debated, but the second element is likely to be a Cumbric word cognate with Welsh tref 'farmstead'. If so, the first element is probably also a Cumbric word such as hâl 'marsh'. Alternatively, the name might come from Old English, for example heald 'sloping, bent' and trēow 'tree'.
