= Common Brittonic =

Ancient British Celtic language

- *Brittonikā
- Region: Great Britain
- Ethnicity: Britons
- Era: c. 6th century BC to mid-6th century AD; Developed into Old Welsh, Cumbric, Old Cornish, Old Breton and potentially Pictish
- Language family: Indo-European: Celtic; Insular Celtic; Brittonic; Common Brittonic

Language codes
- ISO 639-3: –
- Linguist List: brit
- Glottolog: None
- Linguasphere: 50-AB

Common Brittonic (Welsh: Brythoneg; Cornish: Brythonek; Breton: Predeneg), also known as Common Brythonic, British, or Proto-Brittonic, is the reconstructed Celtic language thought to be historically spoken by the Celtic Britons in Britain and Brittany. It is the common ancestor of the later Brittonic languages.

It is a form of Insular Celtic, descended from Proto-Celtic, a theorized parent language that, by the first half of the first millennium BC, was diverging into separate dialects or languages. Evidence from early and modern Welsh shows that Common Brittonic was influenced by Latin during the Roman period, especially in terms related to the church and Christianity. By the sixth century AD, the languages of the Celtic Britons were swiftly diverging into Neo-Brittonic: Welsh, Cumbric, Cornish, Breton. Pictish may either have been one of Brythonic languages or a descendant of a close separate branch.

Over the next three centuries, Brittonic was replaced by Scottish Gaelic in most of Scotland, and by Old English (from which descend Modern English and Scots) throughout most of modern England as well as Scotland south of the Firth of Forth. Cumbric disappeared in the 12th century, and in the far south-west, Cornish probably became extinct in the 18th century, though it has since been revived. (Note: A study of 2018 found the number of people with at least minimal skills in Cornish as over 3,000, including around 500 estimated to be fluent.) Welsh and Breton are the only daughter languages that have survived fully into the modern day.

== History ==
=== Sources ===
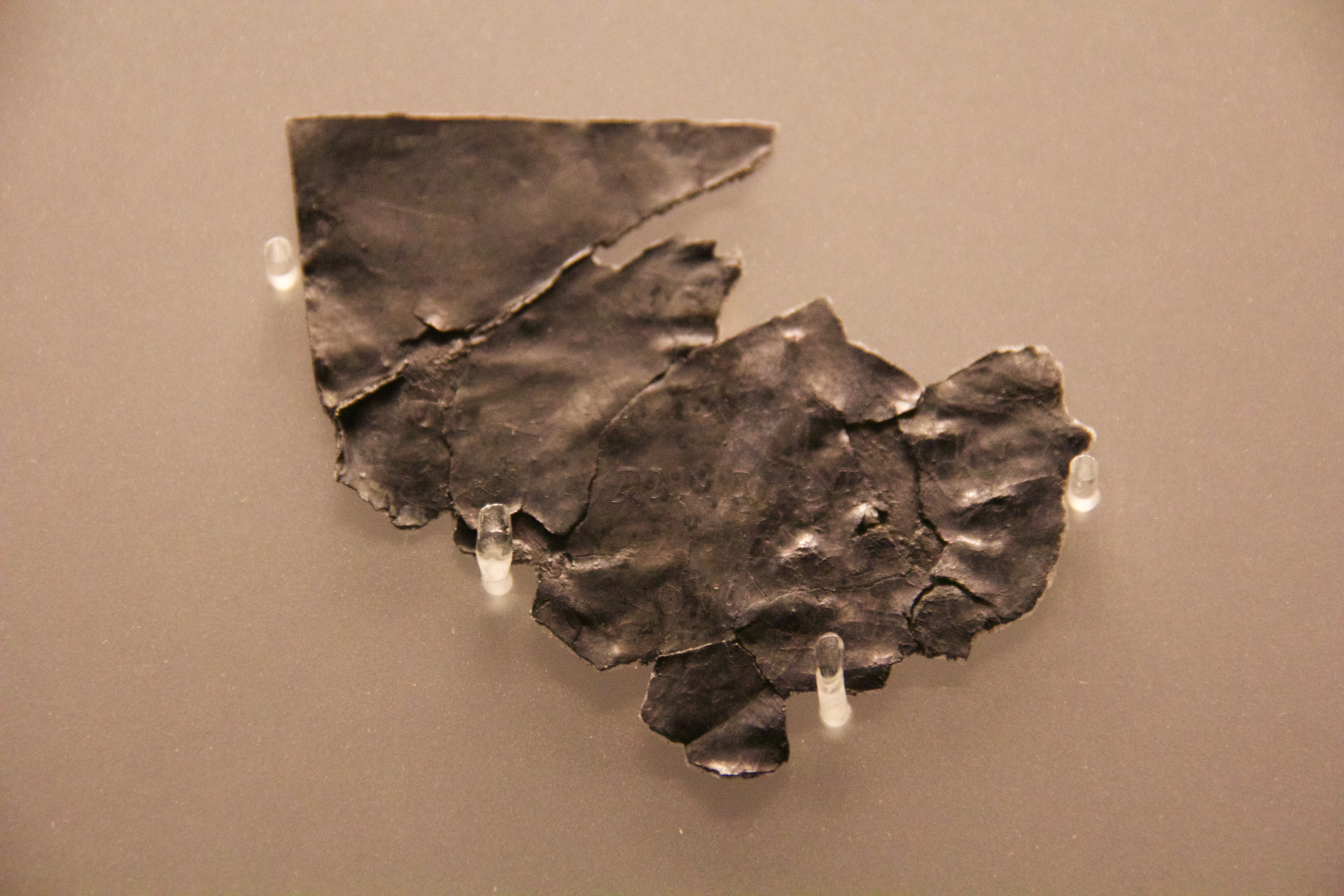
Bath curse tablet featuring possible Common Brittonic

No documents in the language have been found, but a few inscriptions have been identified. The Bath curse tablets, found in the Roman feeder pool at Bath, Somerset (Aquae Sulis), bear about 150 names – about 50% Celtic (but not necessarily Brittonic). An inscription on a metal pendant (discovered there in 1979) seems to contain an ancient Brittonic curse: "Adixoui Deuina Deieda Andagin Uindiorix cuamenai". (Sometimes the final word has been rendered cuamiinai.) This text is often seen as: 'The affixed – Deuina, Deieda, Andagin [and] Uindiorix – I have bound'; else, at the opposite extreme, taking into account case-marking – -rix 'king' nominative, andagin 'worthless woman' accusative, dewina deieda 'divine Deieda' nominative/vocative – is: 'May I, Windiorix for/at Cuamena defeat [or 'summon to justice'] the worthless woman, [oh] divine Deieda.'

A tin/lead sheet retains part of nine text lines, damaged, with probable Brittonic names.

Local Roman Britain toponyms (place names) are evidentiary, recorded in Latinised forms by Ptolemy's Geography discussed by Rivet and Smith in their book of that name published in 1979. They show most names he used were from the Brittonic language. Some place names still contain elements derived from it. Tribe names and some Brittonic personal names are also taken down by Greeks and, mainly, Romans.

Tacitus's Agricola says that the language differed little from that of Gaul. Comparison with what is known of Gaulish confirms the similarity.

=== Pictish and Pritenic ===
Pictish, which became extinct around the 12th to 13th century, was the spoken language of the Picts in Northern Scotland. Despite significant debate as to whether this language was Brythonic, Insular Celtic or non-Indo-European, items such as geographical and personal names documented in the region gave evidence that this language was most closely aligned with the Brittonic branch of Celtic languages. The question of the extent to which this language was distinguished, and the date of divergence from Brythonic or all Insular Celtic languages was historically disputed.

Pritenic (also Pretanic and Prittenic) is a term proposed in 1955 by Kenneth H. Jackson to describe a hypothetical Roman-era (1st to 5th centuries) predecessor to the Pictish language. Jackson saw Pritenic as having diverged from Brittonic around the time of AD 75–100, Guto considered Pritenic as a branch, closely related to Brittonic.

Some scholars criticise Pritenic hypothesis. In 2015, linguist Guto Rhys concluded that most proposals that Pictish diverged from Brittonic before c. 500 were incorrect, questionable, or of little importance, and that a lack of evidence to distinguish Brittonic and Pictish rendered the term Pritenic "redundant".

=== Diversification and Neo-Brittonic ===
Common Brittonic vied with Latin after the Roman conquest of Britain in AD 43, at least in major settlements. Latin words were widely borrowed by its speakers in the Romanised towns and their descendants, and later from church use.

By 500–550, Common Brittonic had diverged into the Neo-Brittonic dialects: Old Welsh primarily in Wales, Old Cornish in Cornwall, Old Breton in what is now Brittany, Cumbric in Northern England and Southern Scotland, and potentially Pictish in Northern Scotland.

The modern forms of Breton and Welsh are the only direct descendants of Common Brittonic to have survived fully into the 21st century. Cornish fell out of use in the 1700s but has since undergone a revival. Cumbric and Pictish are extinct and today spoken only in the form of loanwords in English, Scots, and Scottish Gaelic.

== Phonology ==
=== Consonants ===
(Late) Common Brittonic consonants
		Labial		Dental		Alveolar		Palatal	Velar		Labial– velar		Glottal
Nasal			m		n					(ŋ)			
Stop		p	b	t	d				k	ɡ		(ɡʷ)	
Fricative	oral	ɸ	β	θ	ð	s			x	ɣ			h
Fricative	nasal		β̃										
Approximant								j			(ʍ)	w	
Lateral							l						
Trill							r						

=== Vowels ===
Early Common Brittonic vowels
	Front		Central		Back	
	short	long	short	long	short	long
Close	i	iː		ʉː	u	
Close-mid	e	eː			o	
Open-mid		ɛː				ɔː
Open			a			ɑː

The early Common Brittonic vowel inventory is effectively identical to that of Proto-Celtic. /ɨ/ and /ʉ/ have not developed yet.

Late Common Brittonic vowels
	Front		Central		Back
	unrounded	rounded	unrounded	rounded	rounded
Close	i	y	ɨ	ʉ	u
Close-mid	e	ø			o
Open-mid	ɛ				ɔ
Open			a		

By late Common Brittonic, the New Quantity System had occurred, leading to a radical restructuring of the vowel system.

Notes:

- One development apparently confined to the West British precursor of Welsh was the change of short pretonic ɪ and u to rounded and unrounded mid central schwa vowels ə and ɵ respectively.

Vowel developments
Proto-Celtic	Stage									
Proto-Celtic	I	II	III	IV	V	Vb	VI	VII	VIII	IX
Short vowels	*a									
Short vowels	*e									
Short vowels	*i						*ɪ			
Short vowels	*o							*o, *ʉ		
Short vowels	*u							*u, *ʉ		
Long vowels	*ā				*ɔ̄					*ɔ
Long vowels	*ē								*ui	
Long vowels	*ī									*i
Long vowels	*ō		*ū			*ǖ				*ü
Long vowels	*ū	*ǖ				*ī				*i
Diphthongs	*ai			*ɛ̄					*oi	
Diphthongs	*au				*ɔ̄					*ɔ

== Place names ==
Brittonic-derived place names are scattered across Great Britain, with many occurring in the West Country; however, some of these may be pre-Celtic. The best example is perhaps that of each (river) Avon, which comes from the Brittonic aβon[a], "river" (transcribed into Welsh as afon, Cornish avon, Irish and Scottish Gaelic abhainn, Manx awin, Breton aven; the Latin cognate is amnis). When river is preceded by the word, in the modern vein, it is tautological.

=== Examples of place names derived from the Brittonic languages ===
Examples are:

- Avon from abonā (Note: See note on pre-medieval-Latin recording of the letter b at Dover, in this section.) = 'river' (cf. Welsh afon, Cornish avon, Breton aven)
- Britain, cognate with Pritani = (possibly) 'People of the Forms' (cf. Welsh Prydain 'Britain', pryd 'appearance, form, image, resemblance'; Irish cruth 'appearance, shape', Old Irish Cruithin 'Picts')
- Cheviot from *cev- = 'ridge' and -ed, a noun suffix
- Dover: as pre-medieval Latin did not distinguish a Spanish-style mixed [b]-[v] sound, the phonetic standard way of reading Dubrīs is as [dʊβriːs]. It means 'water(s)' (cognate with old Welsh dwfr, plural phonetically [dəvrɔɪð], Cornish dowr, Breton dour, and Irish dobhar).
- Kent from canto- = 'border' (becoming in Welsh cant(el) 'rim, brim', in Breton, kant)
- Lothian, (Lleuddiniawn in medieval Welsh) from *Lugudūn(iānon) 'Fort of Lugus' (compare Gaulish Lugdūnum, now Lyon in France)
- Severn from Sabrīna, perhaps the name of a goddess (modern Welsh, Hafren)
- Thames from Tamesis = 'dark' (probably cognate with Welsh tywyll 'darkness', Cornish tewal, Breton teñval, Irish teimheal, pointing to a Brittonic approximate word temeselo-)
- Thanet (headland) from tan-eto- = 'bonfire', 'aflame' (cf. Welsh tân 'fire', Cornish tanses, Old Breton tanet 'aflame')
- York from Ebur-ākon = 'yew tree stand/group' (cognate with Welsh Efrog, from efwr 'cow parsnip, hogweed' + -og 'abundant in', Breton evor 'alder buckthorn', Irish An Iúraigh 'stand/grove of yew trees'; cognate with Évreux in France, Évora in Portugal and Newry, Northern Ireland) via Latin Eburacum > OE Eoforwīc (re-analysed by English speakers as eofor 'boar' with Old English wic appended at the end) > Old Norse Jórvík

Basic words tor, combe, bere, and hele from Brittonic are common in Devon place-names. Tautologous, hybrid word names exist in England, such as:

- Derwentwater (for Brittonic part see Dover above)
- Chetwood (cognate with Welsh coed, Breton koad)
- Bredon Hill

== Bibliography ==
- Filppula, M.; Klemola, J.; Pitkänen, H. (2001); The Celtic Roots of English, (Studies in Languages, No. 37); University of Joensuu, Faculty of Humanities; ISBN 952-458-164-7.
- Forsyth, K. (1997), Language in Pictland.
- Jackson, Kenneth H. (1953), Language and History in Early Britain.
- Jackson, Kenneth H. (1955), "The Pictish Language"; in F. T. Wainwright, The Problem of the Picts; London: Nelson.
- Koch, John T. (1986), "New Thought on Albion, Ieni and the 'Pretanic Isles'", Proceedings of the Harvard Celtic Colloquium, 6: pp. 1–28.
- Lambert, Pierre-Yves [ed.] (2002), Recueil des inscriptions gauloises II.2. Textes gallo-latins sur instrumentum; Paris: CNRS Editions; pp. 304–306.
- Lambert, Pierre-Yves (2003), La langue gauloise; 2nd ed.; Paris: Editions Errance; p. 176.
- Lockwood, W. B. (1975), Languages of the British Isles Past and Present; London: Deutsch; ISBN 0-233-96666-8.
- McCone, Kim (1996). Towards a Relative Chronology of Ancient and Medieval Celtic Sound Change. Dept. of Old Irish, St. Patrick's College. ISBN 0-901519-40-5. OCLC 1023922722.
- Ostler, Nicholas (2005), Empires of the Word; London: HarperCollins; ISBN 0-00-711870-8.
- Price, Glanville. (2000), Languages of Britain and Ireland; Blackwell; ISBN 0-631-21581-6.
- Rivet, A. and Smith, C. (1979), The Place-names of Roman Britain
- Sims-Williams, Patrick (2003), The Celtic Inscriptions of Britain: Phonology and Chronology, c. 400–1200; Oxford, Blackwell; ISBN 1-4051-0903-3.
- Schrijver, Peter (1995). Studies in British Celtic historical phonology. Brill.
- Ternes, Elmar [ed.] (2011), Brythonic Celtic – Britannisches Keltisch: From Medieval British to Modern Breton; Bremen: Hempen Verlag.
- Trudgill, P. [ed.] (1984), Language in the British Isles; Cambridge University Press.
- Willis, David (2009), "Old and Middle Welsh"; in The Celtic Languages, 2nd ed.; eds. Martin J. Ball & Nichole Müller; New York: Routledge; ISBN 0-203-88248-2; pp. 117–160.
