= Ecclestone (surname) =

Ecclestone is a surname. Notable people with the surname include:

- A. W. Ecclestone (1901–1984), British architect
- Arthur Ecclestone (1906–1990), English footballer
- Bernie Ecclestone (born 1930), British businessman
- George Walter Ecclestone (1865–1940), Canadian politician
- Giles Ecclestone (born 1968), English cricketer
- Petra Ecclestone (born 1988), British model and fashion designer
- Simon Ecclestone (born 1971), English cricketer
- Slavica Ecclestone (born 1958), model and ex-wife of Bernie
- Sophie Ecclestone (born 1999), English cricketer
- Tamara Ecclestone (born 1984), English model and TV personality, daughter of Bernie
- Tim Ecclestone (1947–2024), Canadian ice hockey player
- William Ecclestone (died 1623), Shakespearian actor
- William Ecclestone (footballer) (1873–1937), English footballer

== See also ==
- Eccleston (disambiguation)
