= Gallo-Brittonic languages =

Celtic subdivision containing Gaulish and Brittonic

Gallo-Brittonic
- P-Celtic
- Geographic distribution: Gaul and Great Britain
- Linguistic classification: Indo-European: Celtic; Gallo-Brittonic
- Subdivisions: Gaulish; Brittonic; Pritenic?

Language codes
- Glottolog: None

The Gallo-Brittonic languages, also known as the P-Celtic languages, are a proposed subdivision of the Celtic languages containing the languages of Ancient Gaul (both Celtica and Belgica) and Celtic Britain, which share certain features. Besides common linguistic innovations, speakers of these languages shared cultural features and history. The cultural aspects are commonality of art styles and worship of similar gods. Coinage just prior to the British Roman Period was also similar. In Julius Caesar's time, the Atrebates held land on both sides of the English Channel.

It contrasts with the Insular Celtic hypothesis, which asserts that Goidelic and Brythonic underwent a period of common development and have shared innovations to the exclusion of Gaulish, while the shared changes are either independent innovations that occurred separately in Brythonic and Gaulish or are due to language contact between the two groups.

== Linguistics ==
The hypothesis that the languages spoken in Gaul and Great Britain (Gaulish, Brittonic and potentially Pritenic), descended from a common ancestor, separate from the Celtic languages of Ireland, Spain, and Italy, is based on a number of linguistic innovations, principally the evolution of Proto-Celtic */kʷ/ into /p/ (thus the name "P-Celtic"). These innovations are not shared with the Goidelic languages, which also called Q-Celtic in this model because of their preservation of Proto-Celtic */kʷ/' (often represented as qu in English).

The proposed shared innovations not in Goidelic are:

- Proto-Celtic kʷ > Gallo-Brittonic p, or in voiced form b (e.g. Gaulish mapos, Welsh mab ≠ Irish mac)
- Proto-Celtic mr and ml > Gallo-Brittonic br and bl (e.g. Gaulish broga, Welsh, Breton bro ≠ Old Irish mruig)
- Proto-Celtic wo, we > Gallo-Brittonic wa (e.g. Gaulish uassos, Welsh gwass ≠ Old Irish foss)
- Proto-Celtic ɡʷ > Gallo-Brittonic w
- Early loss of g between vowels in both Gaulish and Brittonic
- Proto-Celtic dj between vowels tended to give Gallo-Brittonic j
- Proto-Celtic *anman > Gallo-Brittonic anwan. (Gaulish anuana, Welsh enuein ≠ Irish ainm; but also Gaulish anmanbe)

== See also ==
- Celtic languages § Classification
