= Cumulative effects (environment) =

Cumulative effects, also referred to as cumulative environmental effects and cumulative impacts, can be defined as changes to the environment caused by the combined impact of past, present and future human activities and natural processes. Cumulative effects to the environment are the result of multiple activities whose individual direct impacts may be relatively minor but in combination with others result are significant environmental effects. The multiple impacts of different activities may have an additive, synergistic or antagonistic effect on one another and with natural processes. Cumulative effects can be difficult to predict and manage due to inadequate environmental baseline data, complex ecological processes, and the large scale at which human development occurs.

The emergence of cumulative effects in environmental regulations began in the 1970s and has since been increasingly seen as a consideration in environmental impact assessments and land management. However, despite its growing relevance, there are no generally accepted methodologies for cumulative effects assessments and there remains debate surrounding the issue.

Many human activities result in direct and indirect impacts that collectively impact the environment. The impacts of activities in combination with natural processes can result in cascading responses in ecosystems that can become unpredictable. Some activities known to have significant impacts on the environment and contribute highly to cumulative effects are marine resource development, energy production and consumption, and land use changes. The cumulative environmental effects of human activities ultimately intensify global warming and climate change.

== History ==
The emergence of cumulative effects considerations in environmental regulations began in the late 1970s when it was realized that proposed development projects should not be assessed in isolation from surrounding land uses. In the United States, cumulative effects consideration were introduced into environmental assessment regulations by the Council on Environmental Quality in 1979. The European Union introduced requirements to consider cumulative effects in environmental assessments in their 1985 Environmental Impact Assessment Directive. In Canada, the analysis of cumulative effects in environmental assessments became required in 1995 by the first Canadian Environmental Assessment Act. Cumulative effects assessments are not legally required in Australia.

Since its introduction into environmental regulations, some countries have worked on integrating cumulative effects considerations into broader scales, such as at the regional or sectoral scale. For example, in 2001 the European Union introduced the directive on Strategic Environmental Assessment which applies to programs and sectoral plans and examines the potential cumulative environmental effects at the early stages of decision-making.

== Factors contributing to cumulative effects ==
Human activities have a range of impacts on the environment, both positive and negative. Many activities have profound negative impacts on the environment that create direct and indirect stressors on ecosystems. These stressors have an additive, synergistic or antagonistic effect on one another, creating cumulative effects to the environment that are different from and more significant than the individual, direct impacts of activities. Although many development activities have individually minor impacts, collectively over time their impact on the environment can be substantial. Over time, indirect impacts of activities may have more severe impacts on ecosystems than direct ones, and can have impacts on larger temporal and spatial scales than that of individual activities.

In some instances, multiple activities may cause a single, common stressor; for example, a factory and a nearby landfill may both release polluting run-off into a river. Other times, multiple activities overlap in time and space and produce multiple different environmental impacts that interact with each other, creating more complex environmental impacts. For example, increasing ocean acidification amplifies the sound of shipping and other marine activities, which then increases the exposure of marine organisms to noise.

Below are some factors contributing to cumulative environmental change:

=== Marine resource development ===
Marine ecosystems are particularly vulnerable to cumulative environmental impacts due to the spatial connectivity of aquatic species and the ecosystems themselves. Marine ecosystems experience environmental impacts from a range of marine-related activities, such as shipping, fishing, offshore oil and gas industries, and deep-sea mining. Some environmental impacts of marine activities are:

- Waste disposal into marine ecosystems by shipping vessels
- Oil spills following accidents
- Noise and light pollution from shipping and drilling activity
- Increased erosion of coasts and river banks from waves produced by marine vessels

Marine ecosystems are also affected by the environmental impacts of terrestrial activities through pollution, waste disposal and run-off. As a result of the multitude of impacts and activities interacting in marine ecosystems, cumulative effects are particularly difficult to quantify and manage.

=== Energy production and consumption ===
The production and consumption of various energy sources have far reaching direct and indirect impacts on the environment. The construction of dams for hydroelectric energy, for example, represent one of the most major human interventions in the hydrological cycle. Dams directly impact the flow of rivers and their chemical characteristics, effecting river health many kilometres downstream. Additionally, the inundation of surrounding ecosystems by water results in a loss in terrestrial habitat and wildlife in the area. The energy production sector can result in many negative impacts on the environment, such as air pollution, acid rain, deforestation, emission of radioactive substances, and ozone depletion, all of which contribute to climate change. Energy production is associated with large amounts of infrastructure, such as power plants, pipelines, wind and solar farms, and dams, which contribute to the environmental effects of land use change.

The consumption of energy by industrial and domestic activities, particularly fossil fuels, are known to have significant impacts on global warming by emitting large amounts of greenhouse gases. The particulate matter, carbon dioxide, methane and other greenhouse gases emitted through energy consumption trap heat in the atmosphere, perpetuating the greenhouse effect.

When making decisions about energy-related activities, one must consider the long-term impacts of the use of energy as well as the direct impacts of the energy production. The cumulative effects of energy production and consumption exemplify the far reaching effects of individual activities and how individual, relatively minor impacts join to have significant impacts on the environment.

=== Land use change ===
Land use changes can have a range of direct and indirect impacts on the environment. Individual changes to land uses (e.g., clearing vegetation to build a home) may result in negligible impacts, but the accumulation of these changes across a region or landscape may result in major impacts. Land use changes can cause dramatic losses to high quality and intact wildlife habitat. Residential development and road construction, for example, directly result in fragmenting and reducing the quality of wildlife habitat. Other direct impacts on the ecosystem include noise, light, and air pollution from increased human and vehicle traffic and construction. During construction of new projects, native vegetation is often removed, which can result in changes to the composition of wildlife in the surrounding areas. Additionally, the amount of fencing typically increases with more development, which prevents many species from moving freely. Wildlife will change their behaviour as a result of changed land uses; for example, deer have been found to avoid developed areas as far as 1 kilometre. Indirectly, changes to land uses can result in urban growth, increased deforestation as a result of more accessibility, and degradation of soil stability as a result of cleared vegetation, to name a few.

== Challenges ==
While there is general consensus that cumulative effects are an important issue, there are many challenges facing their assessment and management. Additionally, much work has been done on integrating cumulative effects into environmental regulations, but the study of cumulative effects is inconsistent and at time insufficient. Currently, most global approaches to development activities and their environmental impacts take on a project-specific lens. Environmental assessments function on a project-by-project basis, assessing the potential stressors and impacts produced by individual activities. Studies tend to focus on the direct impacts of activities and as a result there is a lot of uncertainty surrounding their indirect impacts on the environment. Similarly, there is a lack of studies that examine the additive, synergistic and antagonistic impacts of multiple projects that interact across time and space.

Because of the project-specific nature of most environmental assessment work, the data resulting from their studies are not in line with the needs of cumulative effects analyses. The approach scientists take to cumulative effects research and the information environmental assessment practitioners and land managers need to make decisions are disconnected: scientists typically focus cumulative effects research on the responses of ecological components to stressors, while decision-makers are interested in understanding the connection between human activities and stressors. Additionally, there is a great need for improved baseline data and empirical evidence. Currently, many databases used to support environmental assessment work do not conform with quality control protocols and standard formats, and the data are obtained on a range of spatial and temporal scales, resulting in inconsistent data.

Many tools and methods for cumulative effects studies have been developed, however, there is no approach that is universally accepted by land managers, scientists, and environmental assessment practitioners. Some researchers have published methodologies for cumulative effects studies, but they have generally been developed in relation to individual projects and therefore cannot be applied to broader contexts. Many of the debates surrounding the methodologies for cumulative effects analyses are associated with defining the appropriate geographic and temporal boundaries needed to adequately assess cumulative effects:

- The spatial scale of human activities and their related stressors can be difficult to define; activities can result in environmental impacts from a local scale (e.g., run-off) to a global scale (e.g., climate change). The range in spatial scales of environmental impacts of human activities makes it difficult to determine the appropriate scale at which to conduct cumulative effects studies. Most frequently, researchers will define the spatial scale of studies by the project footprint, the jurisdictional or administrative boundaries (e.g., city, national park) or the watershed within which an activity is located. Cumulative effects studies would ideally be done at an ecoregion scale, however studies of this nature are limited by the lack of baseline data at this broad scale. Studies with narrow spatial scales mean that potentially important interactions between stressors occurring outside the study boundaries may be omitted.
- It is important for cumulative effects studies to adequately study the accumulation of past, present and potential future impacts of activities on the environment. The temporal scope of most studies are typically based on the length of construction, operation and decommissioning of an activity, treating all historical activities as part of the ecosystem's baseline. Using baseline data that treats historical and ongoing activities as part of the baseline of a study may mask their ecological impacts and suggest that stressors from a proposed activity may not have significant impacts on the environment. It is also important to incorporate potential future projects into cumulative effects analyses by predicting various scenarios, conditions, and events and their potential interactions with other projects. The challenge for researchers remains determining how far in the past and how far into the future is necessary for adequately capturing past, present and potential future environmental effects.

== Solutions ==
Below are some potential solutions to the previously mentioned challenges facing cumulative effects:

- Move away from project-specific environmental assessments: Cumulative effects are best understood and managed at a policy, program or sector level because of the need for long-term planning.
- Develop national environmental baseline databases: Agencies and organizations conducting research within nations share their data in a standardized approach that allows for information to be merged and used in various studies. Many practitioners use computer simulations to predict potential impacts of activities and land use change; therefore, an inventory of national environmental baseline data will strengthen the predictive ability of these models.
- Coordination among jurisdictional agencies: The fragmentation of environmental assessments between jurisdiction inadequately addresses cumulative effects problems. Coordination between agencies at various levels (national, regional, local) can help set environmental objectives, anticipate and plan for future development, and share best practices.
- Regional Environmental Assessment (REA): Cumulative effects of human activities on the environment are better understood at a regional scale. Because REAs study the effects of developments occurring within a region, they are more capable than conventional environmental assessments at analyzing cumulative effects. They can also help make more strategic decisions for future development by helping strengthen the understanding the environmental state at a regional scale.
- Considering cumulative effects early: It is important that cumulative effects be considered early and throughout environmental assessments and the lifetime of a project. Particularly for projects with impacts that are unknown or uncertain, new information should be continually captured and management and mitigation approaches changed as these uncertainties become clearer.

== Policies ==
The United States uses a cumulative impact assessment (CIA), also referred to as cumulative effects assessment (CEA), which is a process that identifies additive or interactive environmental effects occurring from human activities over time in order to then avoid cumulative environmental effects. This is an effective potential policy that can also help in productive environmental planning and management. Most development activities have individually minor impacts but collectively over time their impact on the environment is more substantial. In many countries, CIA is undertaken as part of the environmental impact assessment (EIA) process.
Landscape management, such as creating wildlife reserves, will help to ensure human development can not occur there and therefore reduce cumulative effects in that area. In many cases in the United States, the government will not fund these environmental assessments because it requires great funding over a long term.

== Cumulative Impact Paradox ==
The Cumulative Impact Paradox is a theory derived by Charles H. Eccleston wherein there is no scenario in which a proposed activity could be approved if regulations require their cumulative effects to be insignificant. Eccleston explains that if environmental regulations require decision-makers to consider the significance of proposed projects' contributions to cumulative effects, more rigorous environmental assessments will always be necessary. This paradox presents itself in the United States under the National Environmental Policy Act where it is required to assess cumulative effects in reaching a decision regarding proposed activities. The act allows certain categories of activities with insignificant environmental impacts to be excluded from environmental assessment (Categorical Exclusion) and also allows for activities to undergo minimal levels of environmental review if their predicted impacts are insignificant (Finding of No Significant Impact); otherwise, projects are subject to environmental assessment and an environmental impact statement must be prepared. Eccleston argues that a strict interpretation of the definition of cumulative effects would mean that projects taking place in ecosystems that have already sustained cumulative impacts could never be eligible for a Categorical Exclusion or Finding of No Significant Impact, however insignificant proposed activities' contributions to impacts are. Yet, these approaches are commonly employed in the even when proposed projects involve resources and ecosystems that already experience significant cumulative effects.

Eccleston proposes a solution for resolving this paradox called the Significant Departure Principle. Under this principle, the significance of proposed activities' impacts are assessed in terms of the degree to which they would change the existing cumulative effect baseline. An environmental effect could be deemed insignificant if it does not cause the cumulative effect baseline to significantly change from its conditions without the activity taking place.
