= Southwestern Brittonic languages =

Branch of Brittonic containing Cornish and Breton

Southwestern Brittonic
- Geographic distribution: Brittany; Cornwall
- Linguistic classification: Indo-European: Celtic; Insular Celtic; Brittonic; Southwestern Brittonic
- Proto-language: Proto-Southwestern Brittonic
- Subdivisions: Breton • Gwenedeg; Cornish

Language codes
- Glottolog: sout3176

The Southwestern Brittonic languages (Breton: Predeneg ar mervent, Cornish: Brythonek Dyghowbarthgorlewin) are the Brittonic Celtic languages spoken in what is now South West England and Brittany since the Early Middle Ages. During the period of their earliest attestation, the languages appear to be indistinguishable, but they gradually evolved into the Cornish and Breton languages. They evolved from the Common Brittonic formerly spoken across most of Britain and were thus related to the Welsh and Cumbric varieties spoken in Wales and the Hen Ogledd (the Old North, i.e. Northern England and the Scottish Lowlands), respectively.

The earliest stage of the languages, Primitive Cornish/Breton, is unattested. Written sources are extant from the Old Cornish/Breton period, roughly 800–1100, in which phase the languages are indistinguishable. As such, some linguists such as Peter Schrijver use the term Southwest British (i.e. Southwest Brittonic) to describe the language when "Old Cornish" and "Old Breton" were indistinguishable and only separated by geography rather than linguistically.

The language that was spoken by Britons of Britonia colony in Northwestern Spain during 5-9 centuries AD is often considered a dialect of Southwestern Brythonic/Old Breton language.

== Description ==
Southwestern Brittonic is distinguished from Welsh by sound changes including:

- the raising of */(ɡ)wo-/ to /(ɡ)wu-/ in a pretonic syllable (in Welsh there was no raising)
- the fronting of */aː/ to /œː/ (in Welsh it diphthongized to /aw/)
- the fronting of */a/ to */e/ before */iː/ or */j/ in an old final syllable (in Welsh it diphthongized to /ei/)

Other significant differences are found in Welsh innovations in which Southwestern Brittonic did not participate, such as the development of the voiceless alveolar lateral fricative.
