= Tommy Eccleston =

English footballer

Personal information
- Full name: Thomas Francis Eccleston
- Date of birth: 25 September 1875
- Place of birth: Preston, England
- Date of death: 1949 (aged 76–77)
- Position: Wing half

Senior career*
Years	Team	Apps	(Gls)
1895–1897	Preston North End	2	(0)
1897–1899	Reading		
1899–1900	Preston North End	24	(2)
Total		26	(2)
- * Club domestic league appearances and goals

Thomas Francis Eccleston (25 September 1875 – 1946) was an English footballer who played in the Football League for Preston North End.
