= Triermain Castle =

Castle in Cumbria, England

Coordinates: 54.994°N 2.634°W

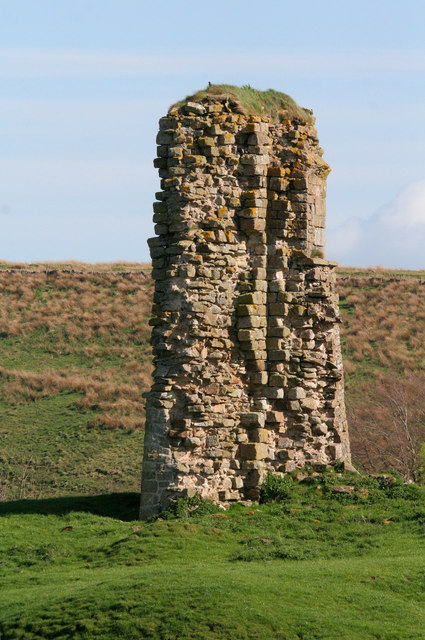
The remains of Triermain Castle.

Triermain Castle was a castle in the civil parish of Waterhead, near Brampton, Cumbria, England. Triermain, Cumbria (Trewermain, Treverman c 1200): 'homestead at the stone' (Welsh tre(f) y maen)

It is featured in Samuel Taylor Coleridge's famous poem "Christabel" where the changeling Geraldine is apparently the daughter of Sir Roland de Vaux of Triermain.

== History ==
Trierman was granted to Hubert I de Vaux by King Henry II of England in 1157. A manor existed on the site and in 1340, Roland de Vaux was given licence to crenellate his manor. the castle was constructed utilising stone robbed from Hadrian's Wall. The castle was ruinous by the mid 16th century. On 17 February 1953 it became a scheduled monument.
