= Brittonic languages =

Celtic language family branch

Brittonic
- Brythonic, British Celtic; *Brittonikā
- Geographic distribution: Wales, Cornwall, Brittany, in antiquity all of Great Britain, during the Early Middle Ages in Northern England and Southern Scotland and other western parts of Britain, Pictland, Britonia
- Linguistic classification: Indo-European: Celtic; Nuclear Celtic/Insular Celtic; Brittonic
- Proto-language: Common Brittonic
- Subdivisions: Western Brittonic; Southwestern Brittonic; ?Pictish/Pritenic †

Language codes
- Glottolog: bryt1239
- The Brittonic-speaking community around the sixth century

The Brittonic languages (also Brythonic or British Celtic) form one of the two branches of the Insular Celtic languages; the other is Goidelic. It comprises the extant languages Breton, Cornish, and Welsh. The name Brythonic was derived by Welsh Celticist John Rhŷs from the Welsh word Brython, denoting a Celtic Briton as distinguished from Anglo-Saxons or Gaels.

The Brittonic languages derive from the Common Brittonic language, spoken throughout Great Britain during the Iron Age and Roman period. In the 5th and 6th centuries emigrating Britons also took Brittonic speech to the continent, most significantly in Brittany and Britonia. During the next few centuries, in much of Britain the language was replaced by Old English and Scottish Gaelic, with the remaining Common Brittonic language splitting into regional dialects, eventually evolving into Welsh, Cornish, Breton, Cumbric, and possibly Pictish, which is more often identified as a descendant of a related to Brittonic branch of Celtic, known as Pritenic. Welsh and Breton continue to be spoken as native languages, while a revival in Cornish has led to an increase in speakers of that language. Cumbric and Pictish are extinct, having been replaced by Goidelic and Anglic speech. There is also a community of Brittonic language speakers in Y Wladfa (the Welsh settlement in Patagonia).

== Name ==
The names "Brittonic" and "Brythonic" are scholarly conventions referring to the Celtic languages of Britain and to the ancestral language they originated from, designated Common Brittonic, in contrast to the Goidelic languages originating in Ireland. Both were created in the 19th century to avoid the ambiguity of earlier terms such as "British" and "Cymric". "Brythonic" was coined in 1879 by the Celticist John Rhys from the Welsh word Brython. "Brittonic", derived from "Briton" and also earlier spelled "Britonic" and "Britonnic", emerged later in the 19th century, though being attested in French (as "brittonique") as early as in 1834. "Brittonic" became more prominent through the 20th century, and was used in Kenneth H. Jackson's highly influential 1953 work on the topic, Language and History in Early Britain. Jackson noted by that time that "Brythonic" had become a dated term: "of late there has been an increasing tendency to use Brittonic instead." Today, "Brittonic" often replaces "Brythonic" in the literature. Rudolf Thurneysen used "Britannic" in his influential A Grammar of Old Irish, although this never became popular among subsequent scholars.

Comparable historical terms include the Medieval Latin lingua Britannica and sermo Britannicus and the Welsh Brythoneg. Some writers use "British" for the language and its descendants, although, due to the risk of confusion, others avoid it or use it only in a restricted sense. Jackson, and later John T. Koch, use "British" only for the common ancestor of the Brittonic languages, otherwise known as "Common Brittonic".

Before Jackson's work, "Brittonic" and "Brythonic" were often used for all the P-Celtic languages, including not just the varieties in Britain but those Continental Celtic languages that similarly experienced the evolution of the Proto-Celtic language element /kʷ/ to /p/. However, subsequent writers have tended to follow Jackson's scheme, rendering this use obsolete.

The name "Britain" itself comes from Latin: Britannia~Brittania, via Old French Bretaigne and Middle English Breteyne, possibly influenced by Old English Bryten[lond], probably also from Latin Brittania, ultimately an adaptation of the native word for the island, *Pritanī.

An early written reference to the British Isles may derive from the works of the Greek explorer Pytheas of Massalia; later Greek writers such as Diodorus of Sicily and Strabo who quote Pytheas' use of variants such as πρεττανική (Prettanikē), "The Britannic [land, island]", and νησοι βρεττανιαι (nēsoi brettaniai), "Britannic islands", with Pretani being a Celtic word that might mean 'painted ones' or 'tattooed folk', referring to body decoration.

== Evidence ==
Knowledge of the Brittonic languages comes from a variety of sources. The early language's information is obtained from coins, inscriptions, and comments by classical writers as well as place names and personal names recorded by them. For later languages, there is information from medieval writers and modern native speakers, together with place names. The names recorded in the Roman period are given in Rivet and Smith.

== Characteristics ==
The Brittonic branch is also referred to as P-Celtic because linguistic reconstruction of the Brittonic reflex of the Proto-Indo-European phoneme *kʷ is p as opposed to Goidelic k. Such nomenclature usually implies acceptance of the P-Celtic and Q-Celtic hypothesis rather than the Insular Celtic hypothesis because the term includes certain Continental Celtic languages as well. Other major characteristics include:

- The retention of the Proto-Celtic sequences *am and *an, which mostly result from the Proto-Indo-European syllabic nasals.
- Celtic /w/ (written u in Latin texts and ou in Greek) became gw- in initial position, -w- internally, whereas in Gaelic it is f- in initial position and disappears internally:

Proto-Celtic	*windos ‘white’	*wastos ‘servant’
Proto-Brythonic	*gwɨnn	*gwass
Breton	gwenn	gwas
Cornish	gwynn	gwas
Welsh	gwyn m., gwen f.	gwas
(contrast Irish)	fionn	MIr. foss

=== Initial s- ===
- Initial s- followed by a vowel was changed to h-:

Proto-Celtic	*senos ‘old’	*sīros ‘long’	*samalis ‘similitude’
Proto-Brythonic	*hen	*hir	*haβ̃al
Breton	hen	hir	hañval
Cornish	hen	hir	haval
Welsh	hen	hir	hafal
(contrast Irish)	sean	síor	samhail

- Initial s- was lost before /l/, /m/ and /n/:

Proto-Celtic	*slimonos ‘polished, smooth’	*smēros ‘marrow’	*sniyeti ‘to turn, twist’
Proto-Brythonic	*llɨvn	*mer	*nɨðid
Breton	levn	mel	nezet
Cornish	leven	mer	nedha
Welsh	llyfn	mêr	nyddu
(contrast Irish)	sleamhain	smior	OIr. sníid, Mod. sníomh

- The initial clusters sp-, sr-, sw- became f-, fr-, chw-:

Proto-Celtic	*sɸerā ‘heel’	*srognā ‘nose’	*swīs ‘you (pl.)’
Proto-Brythonic	*fer	*froɨn	*hwi
Breton	fer	froen	c’hwi
Cornish	fer	frig	hwi
Welsh	ffêr	ffroen	chwi
(contrast Irish)	seir	srón	OIr. síi, Mod. sibh

=== Lenition ===
- Voiceless plosives become voiced plosives in intervocalic position.

	/t/	/k/
Lenited	/d/	/g/
(contrast Old Irish)	/θ/	/x/

- Voiced plosives became soft spirants in intervocalic position and before liquids:

	/b/	/m/	/d/	/g/
Welsh	/v/ f		/ð/ dd	∅ (earlier /ɣ/ /j/)
Cornish	/v/ v		/ð/ dh	∅ (earlier /ɣ/ /j/)
Breton	/v/ v		/z/ z	/ɣ/ c’h
(contrast Old Irish)	/β/ bh	/β̃/ mh	/ð/ dh	/ɣ/ /j/ gh

=== Voiceless spirants ===
- Geminated voiceless plosives transformed into spirants:

	/pp/	/tt/	/kk/
Breton	/f/	/z/	/x/
Cornish	/f/	/θ/	/x/
Welsh	/f/	/θ/	/x/
(contrast Irish)	/p/	/t/	/k/

	cippus	*cattos	*bucca
Breton	kef	kazh	boc’h
Cornish	kyf	kath	bogh
Welsh	cyff	cath	boch
(contrast Irish)	ceap	cat	—

- Voiceless stops become spirants after liquids:

Proto-Celtic	*uɸor‑kʷenno ‘end’	*nertos ‘strength, force’
Proto-Brythonic	*gworpenn	*nerto
Breton	gourfenn	nerzh
Cornish	gorfen	nerth
Welsh	gorffen	nerth
(contrast Old Irish)	forcenn	nert

=== Nasal assimilation ===
- Voiced stops were assimilated to a preceding nasal:

Proto-Celtic	*amban ‘butter’	*landā ‘open land’
Proto-Brythonic		*llann
Breton	amann	lann
Welsh	(y)menyn	llann, llan
(contrast Old Irish)	imb	land

- Brittonic retains original nasals before /t/ and /k/:

Proto-Celtic	*kantom ‘hundred’	*ankus ‘death’
Breton	kant	Ankou (personification)
Welsh	cant	angau
(contrast Irish)	céad	éag ‘to die’

== Classification ==
The family tree of the Brittonic languages is as follows:

- Common Brittonic
  - Western Brittonic
    - Cumbric
    - Welsh
  - Southwestern Brittonic
    - Cornish
    - Breton

Brittonic languages in use today are Welsh, Cornish and Breton. Welsh and Breton have been spoken continuously since they formed. For all practical purposes Cornish died out during the 18th or 19th century, but a revival movement has more recently created small numbers of new speakers. Also notable are the extinct language Cumbric, and possibly the extinct Pritenic Pictish. One view, advanced in the 1950s and based on apparently unintelligible ogham inscriptions, was that the Picts may have also used a non-Indo-European language. This view, while attracting broad popular appeal, has virtually no following in contemporary linguistic scholarship. Pictish is more often considered to be a member of its own branch known as Pritenic, which is closer to Brythonic than to Goidelic, but distinct from both.

== History and origins ==
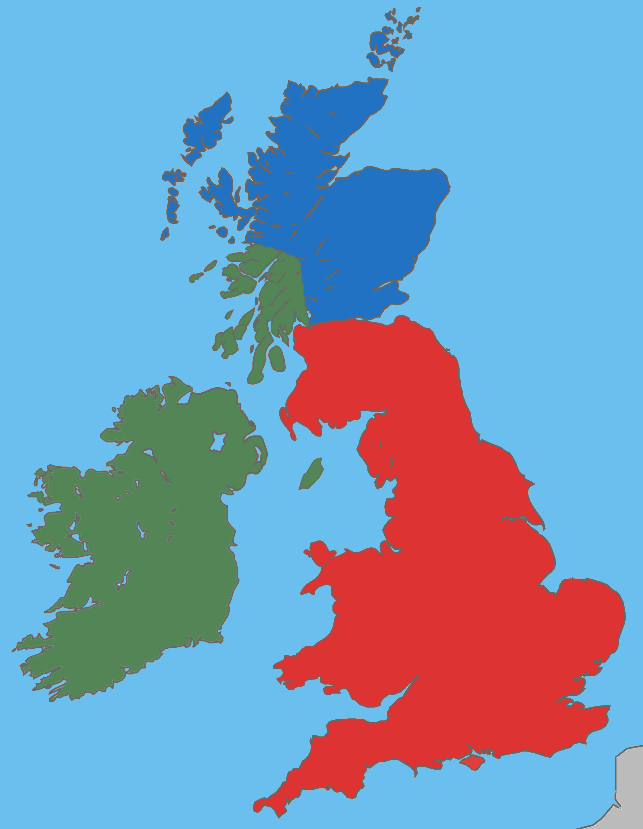
Britain & Ireland in the early to mid-first millennium, before the founding of Anglo-Saxon kingdoms Mainly Brittonic areas. Mainly Pictish areas. Mainly Goidelic areas.

The modern Brittonic languages are generally considered to all derive from a common ancestral language termed Brittonic, British, Common Brittonic, Old Brittonic or Proto-Brittonic, which is thought to have developed from Proto-Celtic or early Insular Celtic by the 6th century BC.

A major archaeogenetics study uncovered a migration into southern Britain in the middle to late Bronze Age, during the 500-year period 1,300–800 BC. The newcomers were genetically most similar to ancient individuals from Gaul. During 1,000–875 BC, their genetic markers swiftly spread through southern Britain, but not northern Britain. The authors describe this as a "plausible vector for the spread of early Celtic languages into Britain". There was much less inward migration during the Iron Age, so it is likely that Celtic reached Britain before then. Barry Cunliffe suggests that a Goidelic branch of Celtic may already have been spoken in Britain, but that this middle Bronze Age migration would have introduced the Brittonic branch.

Brittonic languages were probably spoken before the Roman invasion throughout most of Great Britain. It might have been spoken on the Isle of Man, although by the early Middle Ages it had a Goidelic language, Manx. During the period of the Roman occupation of what is now England and Wales (AD 43 to c. 410), Common Brittonic borrowed a large stock of Latin words, both for concepts unfamiliar in the pre-urban society of Celtic Britain such as urbanization and new tactics of warfare, as well as for rather more mundane words which displaced native terms (most notably, the word for 'fish' in all the Brittonic languages derives from the Latin piscis rather than the native *ēskos – which may survive, however, in the Welsh name of the River Usk, Wysg). Approximately 800 of these Latin loan-words have survived in the three modern Brittonic languages. Pictish might have resisted Latin influence to a greater extent than Brittonic languages, potentially splitting from Common Brythonic because of resistance, if wasn't separate from Brythonic before as Pritenic.

It is probable that at the start of the Post-Roman period, Common Brittonic was differentiated into at least two major dialect groups – Southwestern and Western. (Additional dialects have also been posited, but have left little or no evidence, such as an Eastern Brittonic spoken in what is now the East of England.) Between the end of the Roman occupation and the mid-6th century, the two dialects began to diverge into recognizably separate varieties, the Western into Cumbric and Welsh, and the Southwestern into Cornish and its closely related sister language Breton, which was carried to continental Armorica. Jackson showed that a few of the dialect distinctions between West and Southwest Brittonic go back a long way. New divergencies began around AD 500 but other changes that were shared occurred in the 6th century. Other common changes occurred in the 7th century onward and are possibly due to inherent tendencies. Thus the concept of a Common Brittonic language ends by AD 600. Substantial numbers of Britons certainly remained in the expanding area controlled by Anglo-Saxons, but over the fifth and sixth centuries they mostly adopted the Old English language and culture.

Brittonic grammar had a case system similar to Irish and Scottish Gaelic and descending from Proto-Celtic, however this had vanished by the 6th century.

=== Decline ===
The Brittonic languages spoken in what are now Scotland and England began to be displaced in the 5th century through the settlement of Irish-speaking Gaels and Germanic peoples. Henry of Huntingdon wrote c. 1129 that Pictish was "no longer spoken", despite Pictish names appearing up to 14th century.

The displacement of the languages of Brittonic descent was probably complete in all of Britain except Cornwall, Wales, and the English counties bordering these areas such as Devon, by the 11th century. Western Herefordshire continued to speak Welsh until the late nineteenth century, and isolated pockets of Shropshire speak Welsh today.

=== Sound changes ===
The large array of Brittonic sound changes has been documented by Schrijver (1995), building upon Jackson (1953).

==== Changes to long vowels and diphthongs ====
Brittonic has undergone an extensive remodeling of Proto-Celtic diphthongs and long vowels. All original Proto-Celtic diphthongs turned into monophthongs, albeit a number of these re-diphthongized at later stages.

Brittonic default outcomes of long vowels and diphthongs
Proto-Celtic	Proto-Brythonic	Welsh	Cornish	Breton
*ū	*i	i	i	i
*ē	*i	i	i	i
*ī	*i	i	i	i
*eu	*ọ̄>ʉ	u	u/uy	u
*ou	*ọ̄>ʉ	u	u/uy	u
*oi	*ọ̄>ʉ	u	u/uy	u
*ei	*ẹ̄>uɨ	wy	o/oy	oue/oe/oa
*ai	*oɨ	oe	o/oy	oa
*ā	*ọ	aw/o	ue/u	eu/e
*au	*ọ	aw/o	ue/u	eu/e

==== Changes to short vowels ====
The distribution of Proto-Celtic short vowels were reshuffled by various processes in Brittonic, such as the two i-affections, a-affection, raisings, and contact with lenited consonants like *g > /ɣ/ and *s > *h.

The default outcomes of stressed short vowels in Brittonic are as follows:

Brittonic default outcomes of stressed short vowels
Proto-Celtic short vowel	Welsh	Cornish	Breton
*a	a	a	a
*e	e	e	e
*i	ɨ ⟨y⟩	ɪ ⟨y, e⟩ (Old Cornish) e (later)	ɪ ⟨i, e⟩ (Old Breton) e (later)
*o	o	o	o
*u	u ⟨w⟩	o	o(u)

===== Raisings of *e and *o =====
Welsh exhibits raisings of *e to *i > *ɪ > ɨ ⟨y⟩ and *o > /u/ ⟨w⟩ before a nasal followed by a stop.

It is difficult to determine whether the raising from *o to *u also affected Cornish and Breton, since both of those languages generally merge *o with *u.

The raising of *e to *i occurred in all three major Brittonic languages:

- Proto-Celtic *sentus "path" > *hɪnt > Middle Welsh hynt, Middle Cornish hyns, and Old Breton scoiu-hint "side-passage".

Other raising environments identified by Schrijver include:

- When the vowel is preceded by *m and followed by *n.
- When the vowel is in a pretonic syllable, preceded by an alveolar consonant and followed by a nasal.
- When the vowel is followed by an *r which in turn is followed by either *n or a velar consonant.

This raising preceded a-affection, since a-affection reverses this raising whenever it applied.

All these raisings not only affected native vocabulary, but also affected Latin loanwords.

Raising of *e and *o, examples derived from Schrijver (1995)
Proto-form	Late Proto-Brittonic	Welsh	Cornish	Breton
Raising before a nasal followed by a stop
*kentus "first, early"	*kɪnt	cynt	kyns	kent
*kʷenkʷe "five"	*pɪmp	pymp	pymp	pemp
*sondos "this"	*hunn	hwn(n)	N/A	N/A
Raising in *mVn- sequences
*menmens "mind"	*mɪnw	mynw	N/A	meno
*moniklos "neck"	*munugl	mwnwgl	mongel	N/A
Raising between alveolar and nasal consonants in pretonic syllables
*Demet- (tribal name)	*Dɪβ̃ed	Dyfed	N/A	N/A
*nemetos "venerated"	*nɪβ̃ed	-nivet (Old Welsh) -nyfet (Middle Welsh)	N/A	-nimet, -nemet (Old Breton)
*temes(e)los "dark(ness)"	*tɪβ̃uɪl	tywyll	tewl/tewal	timuil (Old Breton) teñval (modern Breton)
Latin sonus "sound"	*son (sg.) *sunow (pl.)	son, swn	son	so(u)n
Raising in *Vrn and *VrK sequences
*ast-kornu "bone"	*askurn	asgwrn	askorn	asko(u)rn
*tigernos "lord"	*tɪɣɪrn	teyrn	myghtern	mach-tiern (Old Breton)
*borg- "throw"	*burɣ	bwrw	N/A	N/A
*org- "to strike down"	*urɣ	dygyfwrw (prefixed with to-kom-)	N/A	N/A
*yorkos "roebuck"	*jurx	iwrch	yorgh	yourc'h

===== Interactions of vowels followed by *g =====
Multiple special interactions of vowels occurred when followed by *g.

- *e in such environments can be raised to *ɪ or lowered to *a depending on the following sound.
- *ig > *ɪɣ had a special Welsh development in which it would become e in any environment where internal i-affection would apply. This development affected not only *ig > *ɪɣ, but also *eg > *ɪɣ.
- The -a- in Welsh Cymraeg "Welsh language" and Cymraes "Welshwoman" (both from a base *kom-mrog-) has been explained from a special development of *-og- to *-ag- pre-apocope antepenultimate syllables.

Outcomes of vowels before *g in Brittonic
Proto-form	Late Proto-Brittonic	Welsh	Cornish	Breton
*ege, *egi > *age, *agi
*segetlā "plough-handle"	*haɣeðl	haeddel	hedhel	hae(z)l
*dregenom "blackthorn"	*draɣen	draen	dreyn	draen
*egV > *ɪgV if not lowered to *ag
*tegos "house"	*tɪɣ	tŷ	chi	ti
*segos "bold, brave"	*hɪɣ	hy	N/A	N/A
*ig- > *ɪɣ > *e in Welsh in internal i-affection environments
*tigernos "lord"	*tɪɣɪrn	teyrn	myghtern	mach-tiern (Old Breton)
*brigantī "privilege"	*brɪɣẹnt	bryeint (Old Welsh) breint (Middle Welsh) braint (Modern Welsh)	N/A	Brient (Old Breton)
*wegatikos "woven"	*gwɪɣẹdɪg	gweedig	N/A	N/A
Latin (Segontium)	*sɪɣönt	Segeint (Old Welsh); Seint (Middle Welsh)	N/A	N/A

===== Assimilation of *oRa to *aRa =====
Closely paralleling the common Celtic change of *eRa > *aRa (Joseph's rule) is the change of *oRa to *aRa in Brittonic, with R standing for any lone sonorant. Unlike Joseph's rule, *oRa to *aRa did not occur in Goidelic. Schrijver demonstrates this rule with the following examples:

- Proto-Celtic *kolanV- "corpse": Welsh celain, plural calanedd vs. Irish colainn
- Proto-Celtic *toranos "thunder": taran in all three Brittonic languages vs. Irish torann

Assuming that Welsh manach (borrowed from Latin monachus "monk") also underwent this assimilation, Schrijver concludes that this change must predate the raising of vowels in *mVn- sequences, which in turn predates a-affection (an early fifth-century process).

===== /je/ > /ja/ =====
In Brittonic, Celtic *ye generally became /ja/. Some examples cited by Schrijver include:

- Proto-Celtic *yegis > Brittonic *jaɣ > Welsh iâ "ice" vs. Old Irish aig, genitive ega (the a in the Irish word arose via an unrelated development involving *g)
- Proto-Celtic *yestu "boiling" > Brittonic *jas > Welsh ias vs. early Irish ess "cataract"
- Proto-Celtic *gyemos "winter" > Brittonic *gəijaβ̃ > Welsh gaeaf vs. Irish gaim, gem (-a- analogical)

===== *wo =====
The sequence *wo was quite volatile in Brittonic. It originally manifested as *wo in unlenited position and *wa in lenited position. Word-initially, this allomorphy was gone in medieval times, leveled out in various ways. Whichever of *o or *a to be generalized in the reflexes of a word in a given Brittonic language is completely unpredictable, and occasionally both o and a reflexes have been attested within the same language. Southwest Brittonic languages like Breton and Cornish usually generalize the same variant of *wo in a given word while Welsh tends to have its own distribution of variants.

The distribution of *wo/wa is also complicated by an Old Breton development where *wo that had not turned to *gwa would split into go(u)- (Old Breton gu-) in penultimate post-apocope syllables and go- in monosyllables.

===== Developments of *ub =====
The sequence *ub > *uβ remained as such when followed by a consonant, for instance in Proto-Celtic *dubros "water" > *duβr > Welsh dwfr, dŵr and Breton dour.

However, if no consonant exists after a *ub sequence, the *u merges with whatever Proto-Celtic *ou and *oi became, the result of which is written ⟨u⟩ in the Brittonic languages. The lenited *b > *β is lost word-finally after this happens.

- *dubus "black" > Welsh du, Cornish du, Breton du
- *lubV- "herb" > Old Breton tutlub, tutlob > Breton tule, tulo
- Latin cubitus > Middle Welsh kufyt, modern Welsh cufydd

Schrijver dates this development between the 6th to 8th centuries, with subsequent loss of *β datable to the 9th century.

===== a-affection =====
In Brittonic, final a-affection was triggered by final-syllable *ā or *a, which was later apocopated. This process lowered *i and *u in the preceding syllable to *e and *o, respectively.

A-affection, by affecting feminine forms of adjectives and not their masculine counterparts, created root vowel alternations by gender such as *windos, feminine *windā > *gwɪnn, feminine *gwenn > Welsh gwyn, feminine gwen.

===== i-affection =====
There were two separate processes of i-affection in Brittonic, both causing fronting of vowels: final i-affection and internal i-affection.

Final i-affection occurred when the penultimate short vowels *a, *e, *o, *u were followed by Proto-Celtic *i, *ī, and *ū in the very last syllable. The results are slightly different in three languages.

==== Simplified summary of consonantal outcomes ====
The regular consonantal sound changes from Proto-Celtic to Welsh, Cornish, and Breton are summarised in the following table. Where the graphemes have a different value from the corresponding IPA symbols, the IPA equivalent is indicated between slashes. V represents a vowel; C represents a consonant.

Proto-Celtic	Late Brittonic	Welsh	Cornish	Breton
*b-	*b-	b	b	b
*-bb-	*-b-	b	b	b
*-VbV-	*-VβV- > -VvV-	f /v/	v	v
*d-	*d-	d	d	d
*-dd-	*-d-	d	d	d
*-VdV-	*-VðV-	dd /ð/	dh /ð/	z /z/ or lost
*g-	*g-	g	g	g
*-gg-	*-g-	g	g	g
*-VgV-	*-VɣV- > -VjV-	(lost)	(lost)	(lost)
*ɸ-	(lost)	(lost)	(lost)	(lost)
*-ɸ-	(lost)	(lost)	(lost)	(lost)
*-xt-	*-xθ- > -(i)θ	th /θ/	th /θ/	zh /z/ or /h/
*j-	*i-	i	i	i
*-j	*-ð	-dd /ð/	-dh /ð/	-z /z/ or lost
*k-	*k-	c /k/	k	k
*-kk-	*-x-	ch /x/	gh /h/	c'h /x/ or /h/
*-VkV-	*-g-	g	g	g
*kʷ-	*p-	p	p	p
*-kʷ-	*-b-	b	b	b
*l-	*l-	ll /ɬ/	l	l
*-ll-	*-l-	l	l	l
*-VlV-	*-l-	l	l	l
*m-	*m-	m	m	m
*-mb-	*-mm-	m	m	m
*-Cm-	*-m-	m	m	m
*-m-	*-β̃-	f /v/, w	v	ñv /-̃v/
*n-	*n-	n	n	n
*-n-	*-n-	n	n	n
*-nd-	*-nn-	n, nn	n, nn	n, nn
*-nt-	*-nt-	nt, nh /n̥/	nt	nt
*-pp-	*-ɸ- > -f-	ff /f/	f	f
*r-	*r-	rh /r̥/	r	r
*sr-	*fr-	ffr /fr/	fr	fr
*-r-	*-r-	r	r	r
*s-	*h-, s	h, s	h, s	h or lost, s
*-s-	*-s-	s	s	s
*sl-	*l-	ll /ɬ/	l	l
*sm-	*m-	m	m	m
*sn-	*n-	n	n	n
*sɸ-	*f-	ff /f/	f	f
*sw-	*hw-	chw /xw/	hw /ʍ/	c'ho /xw/
*t	*t	t	t	t
*-t-	*-d-	d	d	d
*-tt-	*-θ-	th /θ/	th /θ/	zh /z/ or /h/
*w-	*ˠw- > ɣw- > gw-	gw	gw	gw
*-VwV-	*-w-	w	w	w
*-V	*-Vh	Vch /Vx/	Vgh /Vh/	Vc'h /Vx/ or /Vh/

== Remnants in England and Scotland ==
=== Place names and river names ===
The principal legacy left behind in those territories from which the Brittonic languages were displaced is that of toponyms (place names) and hydronyms (names of rivers and other bodies of water). There are many Brittonic place names in lowland Scotland and in the parts of England where it is agreed that substantial Brittonic speakers remained (Brittonic names, apart from those of the former Romano-British towns, are scarce over most of England). Names derived (sometimes indirectly) from Brittonic include London, Penicuik, Perth, Aberdeen, York, Dorchester, Dover, and Colchester. Brittonic elements found in England include bre- and bal- for 'hill', while some such as co[o]mb[e] (from cwm) for 'small deep valley' and tor for 'hill, rocky headland' are examples of Brittonic words that were borrowed into English. Others reflect the presence of Britons such as Dumbarton – from the Scottish Gaelic Dùn Breatainn meaning 'Fort of the Britons', and Walton meaning (in Anglo-Saxon) a tun 'settlement' where the Wealh 'Britons' still lived.

The number of Celtic river names in England generally increases from east to west, a map showing these being given by Jackson. These include Avon, Chew, Frome, Axe, Brue and Exe, but also river names containing the elements der-/dar-/dur- and -went e.g. Derwent, Darwen, Deer, Adur, Dour, Darent, and Went. These names exhibit multiple different Celtic roots. One is *dubri- 'water' (Breton dour, Cumbric dowr, Welsh dŵr), also found in the place-name Dover (attested in the Roman period as Dubrīs); this is the source of rivers named Dour. Another is deru̯o- 'oak' or 'true' (Bret. derv, Cumb. derow, W. derw), coupled with two agent suffixes, -ent and -iū; this is the origin of Derwent, Darent, and Darwen (attested in the Roman period as Deru̯entiō). The final root to be examined is went/uent. In Roman Britain, there were three tribal capitals named U̯entā (modern Winchester, Caerwent, and Caistor St Edmunds), whose meaning was 'place, town'.

=== Brittonicisms in English ===
Some, including J. R. R. Tolkien, have argued that Celtic has acted as a substrate to English for both the lexicon and syntax. It is generally accepted that Brittonic effects on English are lexically few, aside from toponyms, consisting of a small number of domestic and geographical words, which "may" include bin, brock, carr, comb, crag and tor. Another legacy may be the sheep-counting system yan tan tethera in the north, in the traditionally Celtic areas of England such as Cumbria. Several words of Cornish origin are still in use in English as mining-related terms, including costean, gunnies, and vug.

Those who argue against the theory of a more significant Brittonic influence than is widely accepted point out that many toponyms have no semantic continuation from the Brittonic language. A notable example is Avon which comes from the Celtic term for river abona or the Welsh term for river, afon, but was used by the English as a personal name. Likewise the River Ouse, Yorkshire, contains the Celtic word usa which merely means 'water' and the name of the river Trent simply comes from the Welsh word for a 'trespasser' (figuratively suggesting 'overflowing river').

Scholars supporting a Brittonic substrate in English argue that the use of periphrastic constructions (using auxiliary verbs such as do and be in the continuous/progressive) of the English verb, which is more widespread than in the other Germanic languages, is traceable to Brittonic influence. Others, however, find this unlikely since many of these forms are only attested in the later Middle English period; these scholars claim a native English development rather than Celtic influence. Ian G. Roberts postulates Northern Germanic influence, despite such constructions not existing in Norse. Literary Welsh has the simple present Caraf = 'I love' and the present stative (al. continuous/progressive) Yr wyf yn caru = 'I am loving', where the Brittonic syntax is partly mirrored in English. (However, English I am loving comes from older I am a-loving, from still older ich am on luvende 'I am in the process of loving'). In the Germanic sister languages of English, there is only one form, for example Ich liebe in German, though in colloquial usage in some German dialects, a progressive aspect form has evolved which is formally similar to those found in Celtic languages, and somewhat less similar to the Modern English form, e.g. 'I am working' is Ich bin am Arbeiten, literally: 'I am on the working'. The same structure is also found in modern Dutch (Ik ben aan het werk), alongside other structures (e.g. Ik zit te werken, lit. 'I sit to working'). These parallel developments suggest that the English progressive is not necessarily due to Celtic influence; moreover, the native English development of the structure can be traced over 1000 years and more of English literature.

Some researchers (Filppula, et al., 2001) argue that other elements of English syntax reflect Brittonic influences. For instance, in English tag questions, the form of the tag depends on the verb form in the main statement (aren't I?, isn't he?, won't we?, etc.). The German nicht wahr? and the French n'est-ce pas?, by contrast, are fixed forms which can be used with almost any main statement. It has been claimed that the English system has been borrowed from Brittonic, since Welsh tag questions vary in almost exactly the same way.

=== Brittonic effect on the Goidelic languages ===
Far more notable, but less well known, are Brittonic influences on Scottish Gaelic, though Scottish and Irish Gaelic, with their wider range of preposition-based periphrastic constructions, suggest that such constructions descend from their common Celtic heritage. Scottish Gaelic contains several P-Celtic loanwords, but, as there is a far greater overlap in terms of Celtic vocabulary than with English, it is not always possible to disentangle P- and Q-Celtic words. However, some common words such as monadh = Welsh mynydd, Cumbric monidh are particularly evident.

The Brittonic influence on Scots Gaelic is often indicated by considering Irish language usage, which is not likely to have been influenced so much by Brittonic. In particular, the word srath (anglicised as "strath") is a native Goidelic word, but its usage appears to have been modified by the Welsh cognate ystrad whose meaning is slightly different.
