= Charles H. Eccleston =

Charles H. Eccleston was an employee of the United States Energy Department (DOE), and later the Nuclear Regulatory Commission (NRC) who was convicted for attempting to breach protected computer systems. Eccleston, a U.S. citizen who had been living in Davao City in the Philippines since 2011, was terminated from his employment at the NRC in 2010. He was detained by Philippine authorities in Manila, Philippines, on March 27, 2015, and deported to the United States to face U.S. criminal charges. He initially came to the attention of the FBI in 2013 after he entered a foreign embassy in Manila and offered to sell a list of over 5,000 e-mail accounts of all officials, engineers and employees of a U.S. government energy agency. He said that he was able to retrieve this information because he was an employee of a U.S. government agency, held a top secret security clearance and had access to the agency's network. He asked for $18,800 for the accounts, stating they were “top secret.” When asked what he would do if that foreign country was not interested in obtaining the U.S. government information he was offering, he stated he would offer the information to China, Iran or Venezuela, as he believed these countries would be interested in the information. On February 2, 2016, he pled guilty to one count of "attempted unauthorized access and intentional damage to a protected computer". In his guilty plea, he admitted scheming to cause damage to the computer network of the DOE through e-mails that he believed would deliver a computer virus to particular employees. He was incarcerated as inmate number 68974-112 and was released on July 15, 2016.

Eccleston is also an American author, consultant and lecturer in US National Environmental Policy Act (NEPA). Dr. Eccleston has received many awards including the National Association of Environmental Professional's (NAEP) Outstanding Achievement Award (2001), the NAEP's Outstanding Environmental Leadership Award (2010), and his college's Outstanding Alumni Award. He has written 10 books and authored over 70 environmental and scientific publications. His books are used by professionals and in university curriculum. His recent works include: The EIS Book, NEPA and Environmental Planning, Global Environmental Policy, Inside Energy, and Preparing NEPA Environmental Assessments. He developed a suite of peer-reviewed tools and techniques for improving and streamlining NEPA. Many of these tools are used by government agencies and in legal cases:

- Sufficiency Test: Tool for systematic determining "how much" information is sufficient to adequately describe a NEPA topic.
- P-EIS Scoping (P-EIS) Tool: Method for determining the appropriate scope of a programmatic EIS.
- Smithsonian Solution Tool: Systematic technique for determining how much an action can be changed before it triggers supplemental NEPA.
- Integrated NEPA/ISO 14001 EMS: Developed first model for integrating NEPA with an ISO 14001 EMS. Integrated EIA & EMS for Shell Houdini ECC Project.
- Decision-Based Scoping (DBS): Technique for determining appropriate scope of an EIS.
- Decision Identification Tree (DIT): Tool for identifying decision points in a DBS process.
- Non-Federal Assessment Tool: Tool for determining when an action is a "federal" action.
- Significant Departure Principle (SDP): Technique for resolving the Cumulative Impact Paradox (CIP).
- The Sphinx Scale: Technique for assessing cumulative significance.
- Cumulatively Significant Greenhouse Emissions Assessment: Technique for determining cumulative significance of greenhouse gas emissions. Also, Assessing Cumulative Significance of Greenhouse Gas Emissions: Resolving The Paradox—The Sphinx Solution.

When employed by the U.S. NRC, Eccleston charged that to minimize public concern and opposition, NRC management had intentionally mislead the public by dismissing significant nuclear safety and environmental issues. Specifically, Eccleston claimed that NRC assessments on risk posed by a nuclear accident, such as a full-scale meltdown, was so small that the agency could dismiss the issue from its EIS analysis. Using the Risk-Uncertainty Test. Eccleston concluded that such a sweeping assertion was scientifically irresponsible, particularly given the Three Mile Island, Chernobyl, and Fukushima accidents. He further concluded that NRC management concealed the actual risk posed to the nation, at large, by disregarding one of the basic EIS requirements to assess the cumulative risk of a major nuclear accident; specifically, he charged that NRC management had intentionally underestimated the actual the risk posed from over 100 operating nuclear reactors by approximately two orders of magnitude (100 times). A special Washington State Legislature Nuclear Power Task corroborated his findings in a section of their final report titled, "Doesn’t NRC address consequences of severe accident in EIS for relicensing?" (September 24, 2014).

== Recent books ==
- Eccleston C. (2004) Megacrises: A Survivor's Guide to the Future
- Eccleston C. (2008). NEPA and Environmental Planning: Tools, Techniques, and Approaches for Practitioners. CRC Press.
- Eccleston C., and March F. (2010). Global Environmental Policy: Principles, Concepts And Practice, CRC Press Inc.
- Eccleston C. (2011). Inside Energy: The Handbook for Implementing an ISO 50001 Energy Management Systems, CRC Press Inc.
- Eccleston C. (2011). Environmental Impact Assessment: A Guide to Best Professional Practices. CRC Press Inc.
- Eccleston C. (2014). The EIS Book: Managing and Preparing Environmental Impact Statements. CRC Press.
- Eccleston C. (2017). Preparing NEPA Environmental Assessments: A Guide to Best Professional Practices. CRC Press.
