= Kenneth H. Jackson =

English linguist and a translator who specialised in the Celtic languages (1909-1991)

Professor Kenneth H. Jackson CBE FBA FRSE FSA Scot

Professor of Celtic Languages, Literatures, History and Antiquities, University of Edinburgh
- In office 1950–1979

Personal details
- Born: Kenneth Hurlstone Jackson; 1 November 1909 Beddington, Surrey, England
- Died: 20 February 1991 (aged 81)
- Occupation: Celtic scholar

Kenneth Hurlstone Jackson (1 November 1909 – 20 February 1991) was an English linguist and a translator who specialised in the Celtic languages, described by Roland Blenner-Hassett as "one of the ablest and most productive Celticists of our time". He argued that text of the Ulster Cycle of tales, written circa AD 1100, preserved an oral tradition originating some six centuries earlier and reflects Celtic Irish society of the third and fourth century AD. His Celtic Miscellany is a popular standard, while his Language and History in Early Britain became the standard account of the early history of the Brittonic languages.

In retirement, Jackson continued his work on place-names and Goidelic languages. However he suffered a stroke in 1984 that restricted his work.

An obituary was published in The Times on 8 March 1991 and in a number of academic journals.

== Early life ==
Born at Beddington, Surrey, England, he was the son of Alan Stuart Jackson and his wife, Lucy Hurlstone.

His early education was at Hillcrest School, Wallington (1916–19), and then at Whitgift School in Croydon, from 1920 to 1928. He won an open scholarship to St John's College, Cambridge in 1928. He studied under Hector and Nora Chadwick, becoming fluent in six Celtic languages. At Cambridge he read Classics and then studied the early cultures of Ireland and Britain. He was then awarded a travelling scholarship during which he undertook study and fieldwork in Wales and Ireland: from 1932 to 1937 he spent time during the summer speaking Irish on the Blasket Islands, where he also undertook linguistic research and collected folklore; he formed a close friendship with the storyteller storyteller Peig Sayers (1873-1958), whose storytelling influenced his ideas about oral tradition considerably. In the 1950s he spent his vacations recording dialects for the Linguistic Survey of Scotland.

== Academic appointments ==
Jackson returned to Cambridge in 1934 as a lecturer in Celtic. In 1939 he went to Harvard University and was appointed an associate professor in 1940, being the first chair of the Department of Celtic Language and Literature. He undertook war service with the Uncommon Languages section of British censorship (where he said he learned Japanese in three weeks). Afterwards he went back to Harvard, and became a full professor in 1948. He accepted the chair of Celtic Languages, History and Antiquities at the University of Edinburgh, Scotland (1950–1979). Shortly after his appointment, he published an article on "The Place of Celtic Studies in an English University", giving an impression of his conception of a Celtic Studies curriculum.

== Publications ==
Jackson is most noted for his 1953 monograph Language and History in Early Britain, described by A. L. F. Rivet and Colin Smith as "a national monument". While at Edinburgh Jackson published articles and books on the ancient Celts, and the Dark Ages and Middle Ages, on all six modern Celtic languages, on folklore, placenames and dialects. A bibliography of his publications appears in Studia Celtica 14/14, pp 5–11 (1979–80). His writings are always insightful and stimulating, often the only sources in English for their subject, and even where the reader may wish to disagree with his conclusions, the weight of his erudition and mastery of the early Celtic material must be taken into account. It is scarcely possible to come across a publication or longer article on Celtic studies that does not refer to Professor Jackson's work. There is also the advantage for those not familiar with the Celtic languages that much of his work is in an English-language medium, although this can make an appreciation of Celtica rather unbalanced, as an understanding of sources in at least Welsh can help develop a larger picture, where different opinions are represented.

=== List of publications ===
- 1935. Studies in early Celtic Nature Poetry. Cambridge: Cambridge University Press, 1935.
- 1935. Early Welsh Gnomic Poems. Cardiff: University of Wales Press, 1935.
- 1951, 1971. A Celtic Miscellany: translations from the Celtic literatures. 2nd edn. Harmondsworth: Penguin Books, 1971. (First published by Routledge & Kegan Paul, 1951). OCLC WorldCat 1079427279. [Poetry and prose from six Celtic languages: Irish, Scottish Gaelic, Manx, Welsh, Cornish and Breton.]
- 1953. Language and History in Early Britain: a chronological survey of the Brittonic languages first to twelfth century A.D.. Edinburgh: Edinburgh University Press, 1953.
- 1956. 'The Pictish Language,' [and Appendix] in F. T. Wainwright, ed., The Problem of the Picts (Edinburgh: Edinburgh University Press, 1956) pp. 129–60.
- 1955. Contributions to the Study of Manx Phonology, University of Edinburgh Linguistic Survey of Scotland Series.
- 1959. "The Arthur of History" Arthurian Literature in the Middle Ages, Oxford: Clarendon Press. ISBN 0-19-811588-1.
- 1959. "Arthur in Early Welsh Verse" Arthurian Literature in the Middle Ages, Oxford: Clarendon Press.
- 1961. The International Popular Tale and Early Welsh Tradition. The Gregynog Lectures, 1961. Cardiff: University of Wales Press.
- 1964. The Oldest Irish Tradition: A Window on the Iron Age, Cambridge: University Press. Reprinted 1999.
- 1967. A Historical Phonology of Breton, Dublin: Dublin Institute for Advanced Studies ISBN 978-0-901282-53-8
- 1969. The Gododdin: the Oldest Scottish poem, Edinburgh: Edinburgh University Press.
- 1990. Aislinge Meic Con Glinne, Dublin Institute for Advanced Studies, Dublin, ISBN 0-901282-94-4

== Other activities ==
Jackson was a Fellow of the British Academy (elected 1957) and a Commissioner for the ancient and historical monuments of Scotland. He held honorary degrees from universities in England, Wales, Ireland and Brittany. He was appointed a CBE in 1985 for his work on Celtic studies. He was an Honorary Fellow of the Modern Language Association. He was a member of the Council of the English Placename Society for over forty years, being both vice-president and then President.

He gave the John Rhys Lecture at the British Academy in 1953 on Common Gaelic, and the 1964 Rede Lecture on The Oldest Irish Tradition.

In 1977 he was elected a Fellow of the Royal Society of Edinburgh. His proposers were Douglas Grant, Evelyn Ebsworth, Neil Campbell, Arnold Beevers, and Sir Thomas Malcolm Knox. He retired in 1979.

== Family ==
He married Janet Dall Galloway on 12 August 1936. Their two children, Alastar and Stephanie, were born in the United States but brought up in Scotland.
