= Celtic Revival =

19th- and 20th-century movements

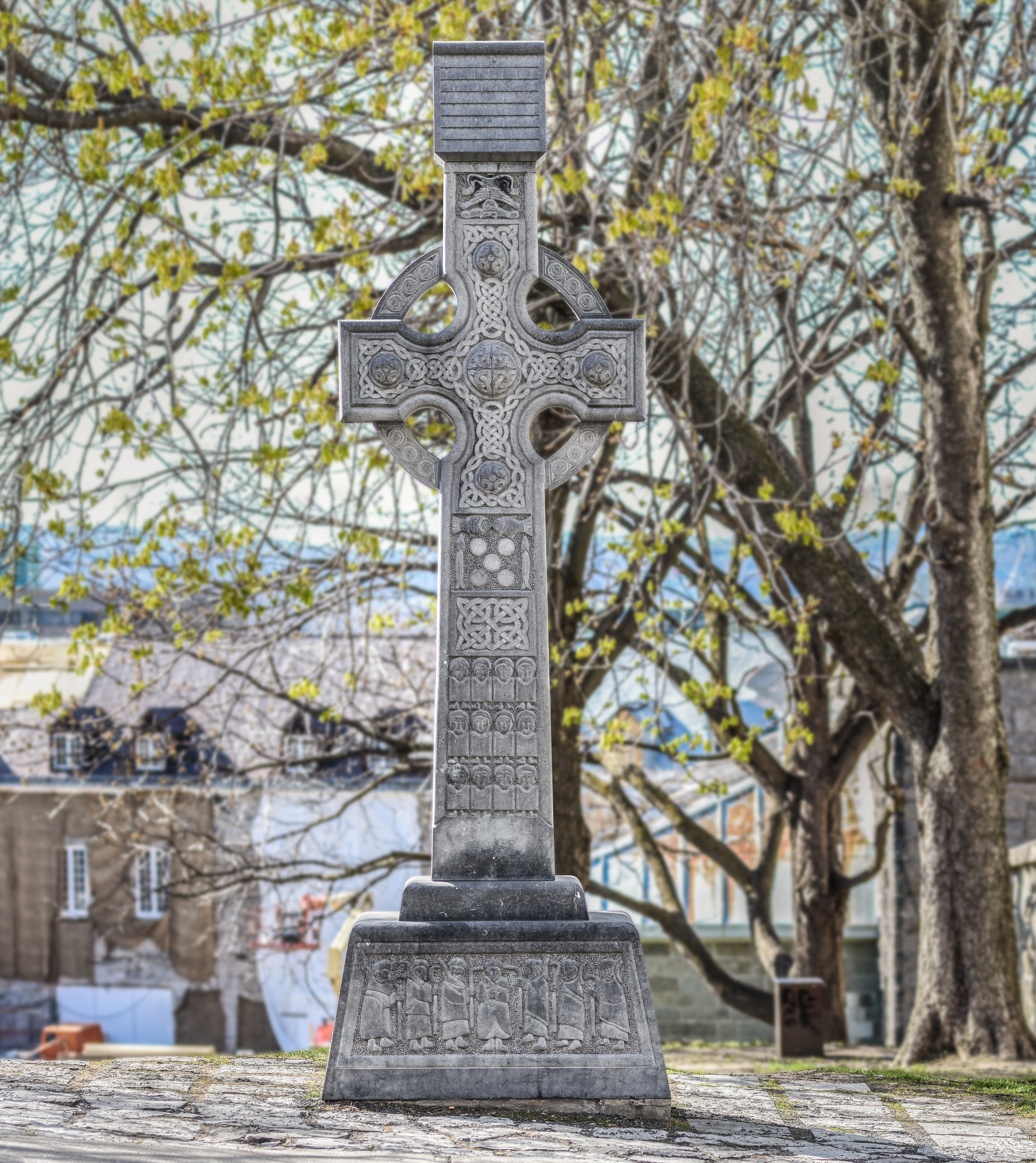
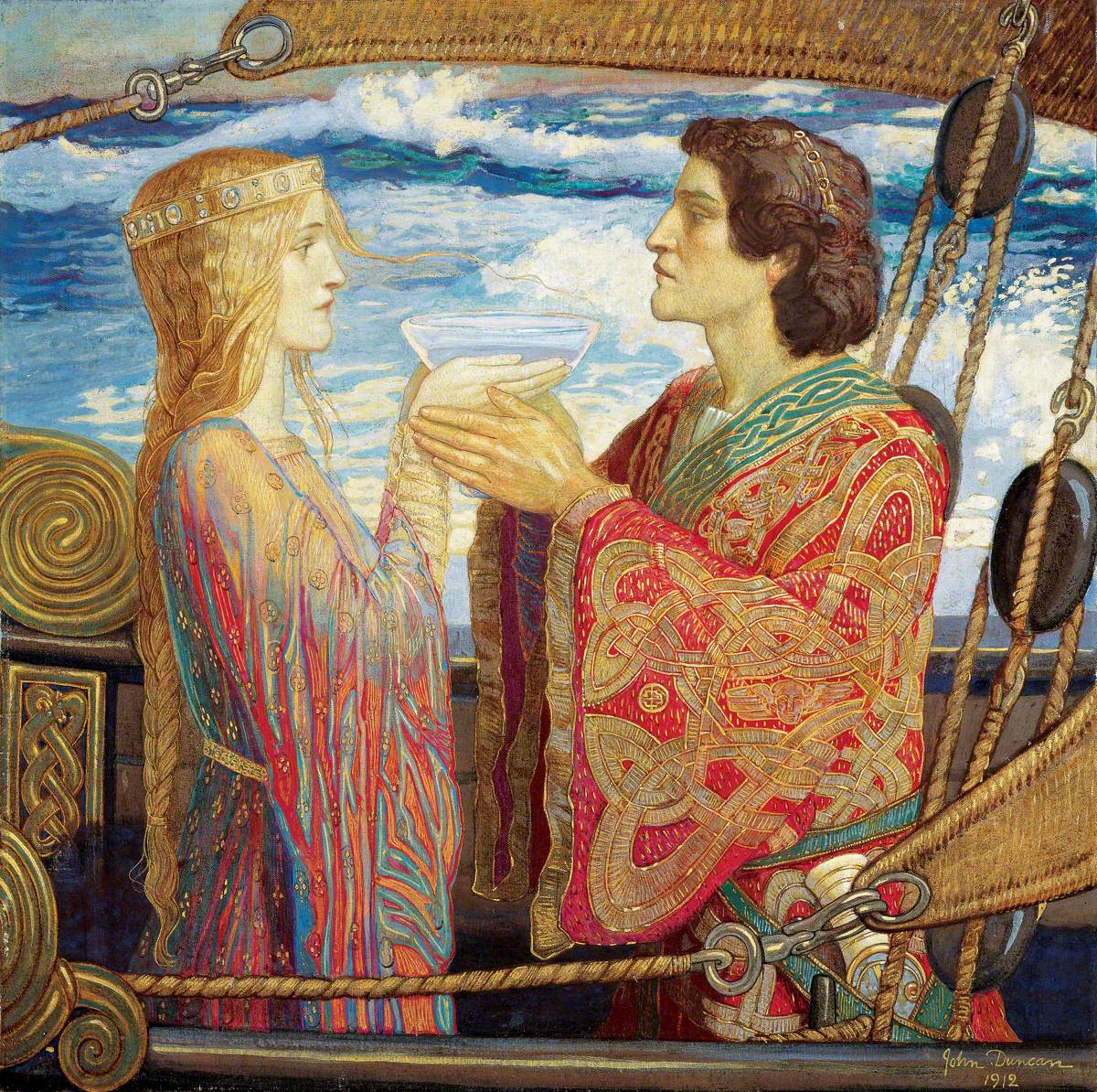
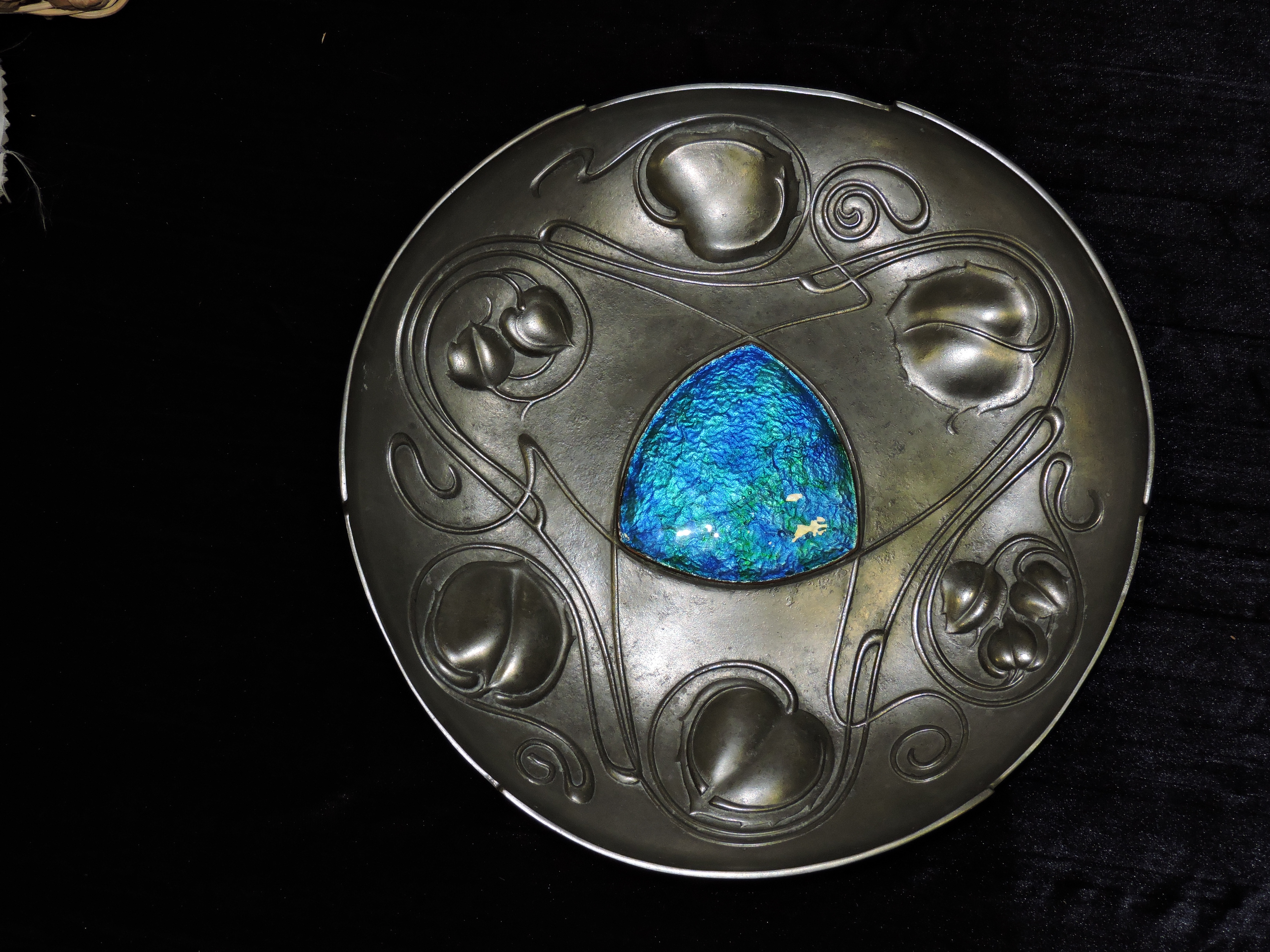
- Top to bottom: Celtic High cross in Quebec (compare with an original); Tristan and Isolde by John Duncan (1912); Bollelin series pewter plate by Archibald Knox (1899)

The Celtic Revival (also referred to as the Celtic Twilight) is a variety of movements and trends in the 19th, 20th and 21st centuries that see a renewed interest in aspects of Celtic culture. Artists and writers drew on the traditions of Gaelic literature, Welsh-language literature, and Celtic art—what historians call insular art (the Early Medieval style of Ireland and Britain). Although the revival was complex and multifaceted, occurring across many fields and in various countries in Northwest Europe, its best known incarnation is probably the Irish Literary Revival. Irish writers including William Butler Yeats, John Millington Synge, Lady Gregory, "Æ" Russell, Edward Martyn, Alice Milligan and Edward Plunkett (Lord Dunsany) stimulated a new appreciation of traditional Irish literature and Irish poetry in the late 19th and early 20th century.

In aspects the revival came to represent a reaction to modernisation. This is particularly true in Ireland, where the relationship between the archaic and the modern was antagonistic, where history was fractured, and where, according to Terry Eagleton, "as a whole [the nation] had not leapt at a bound from tradition to modernity". At times this romantic view of the past resulted in historically inaccurate portrayals, such as the promotion of noble savage stereotypes of the Irish people and Scottish Highlanders, as well as a racialized view that referred to the Irish, whether positively or negatively, as a separate race.

A widespread and still visible result of the revival was the reintroduction of the High cross as the Celtic cross, which now forms a familiar part of monumental and funerary art over much of the Western world.

== History ==
Research into the Gaelic and Brittonic cultures and histories of Britain and Ireland gathered pace from the late 18th century, by antiquaries and historians like Owen Jones in Wales and Charles O'Conor in Ireland. The key surviving manuscript sources were gradually located, edited and translated, monuments identified and published, and other essential groundwork in recording stories, music and language done.

The Welsh antiquarian and author Iolo Morganwg fed the growing fascination in all things Brittonic by founding the Gorsedd, which would in turn spark the Neo-druidism movement.

Interest in Scottish Gaelic culture greatly increased during the onset of the Romantic period in the late 18th century, with James Macpherson's Ossian achieving international fame, along with the novels of Sir Walter Scott and the poetry and lyrics of Thomas Moore.

Throughout Europe, the Romantic movement inspired a great revival of interest in folklore, folk tales, and folk music; even Beethoven was commissioned to produce a set of arrangements of Scottish folk-songs. A growing sense of Celtic identity encouraged and fed off a rise in nationalism throughout the United Kingdom, which was especially intense in Ireland.

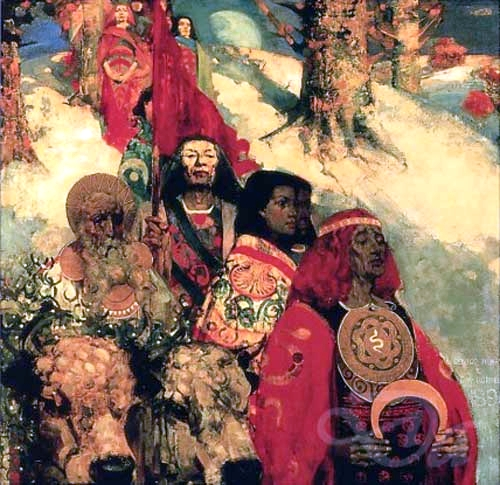
Druids Bringing in the Mistletoe (1890) by E. A. Hornel

In the mid-19th century the revival continued, with Sir Samuel Ferguson, the Young Ireland movement, and others popularising folk tales and histories in countries and territories with Celtic roots. At the same time, archaeological and historical work was beginning to make progress in constructing a better understanding of regional history. Interest in ornamental 'Celtic' art developed, and 'Celtic' motifs began to be used in all sorts of contexts, including architecture, drawing on works like the Grammar of Ornament by the architect Owen Jones. Imitations of the ornate Insular penannular brooches of the 7–9th centuries were worn by figures such as Queen Victoria, many produced in Dublin by West & Son and other makers.

In Scotland were John Francis Campbell's (1821–1885) works the bilingual Popular Tales of the West Highlands (4 vols., 1860–62) and The Celtic Dragon Myth, published posthumously in 1911. The formation of the Edinburgh Social Union in 1885, which included a number of significant figures in the Arts and Craft and Aesthetic movements, became part of an attempt to facilitate a revival in Scotland, similar to that taking place in contemporaneous Ireland, drawing on ancient myths and history to produce art in a modern idiom. Key figures were the philosopher, sociologist, town planner and writer Patrick Geddes (1854–1932), the architect and designer Robert Lorimer (1864–1929) and stained-glass artist Douglas Strachan (1875–1950). Geddes established an informal college of tenement flats for artists at Ramsay Garden on Castle Hill in Edinburgh in the 1890s. Among the figures involved with the movement were Anna Traquair (1852–1936), who was commissioned by the Union to paint murals in the Mortuary Chapel of the Hospital for Sick Children, Edinburgh, (1885–86 and 1896–98) and also worked in metal, illumination, illustration, embroidery, and book binding. The most significant exponent of the artistic revival in Scotland was Dundee-born John Duncan (1866–1945). Among his most influential works are his paintings of Celtic subjects Tristan and Iseult (1912) and St Bride (1913). Duncan also helped to make Dundee a major centre for the Celtic Revival movement along with artists such as Stewart Carmichael and the publisher Malcolm C. MacLeod.

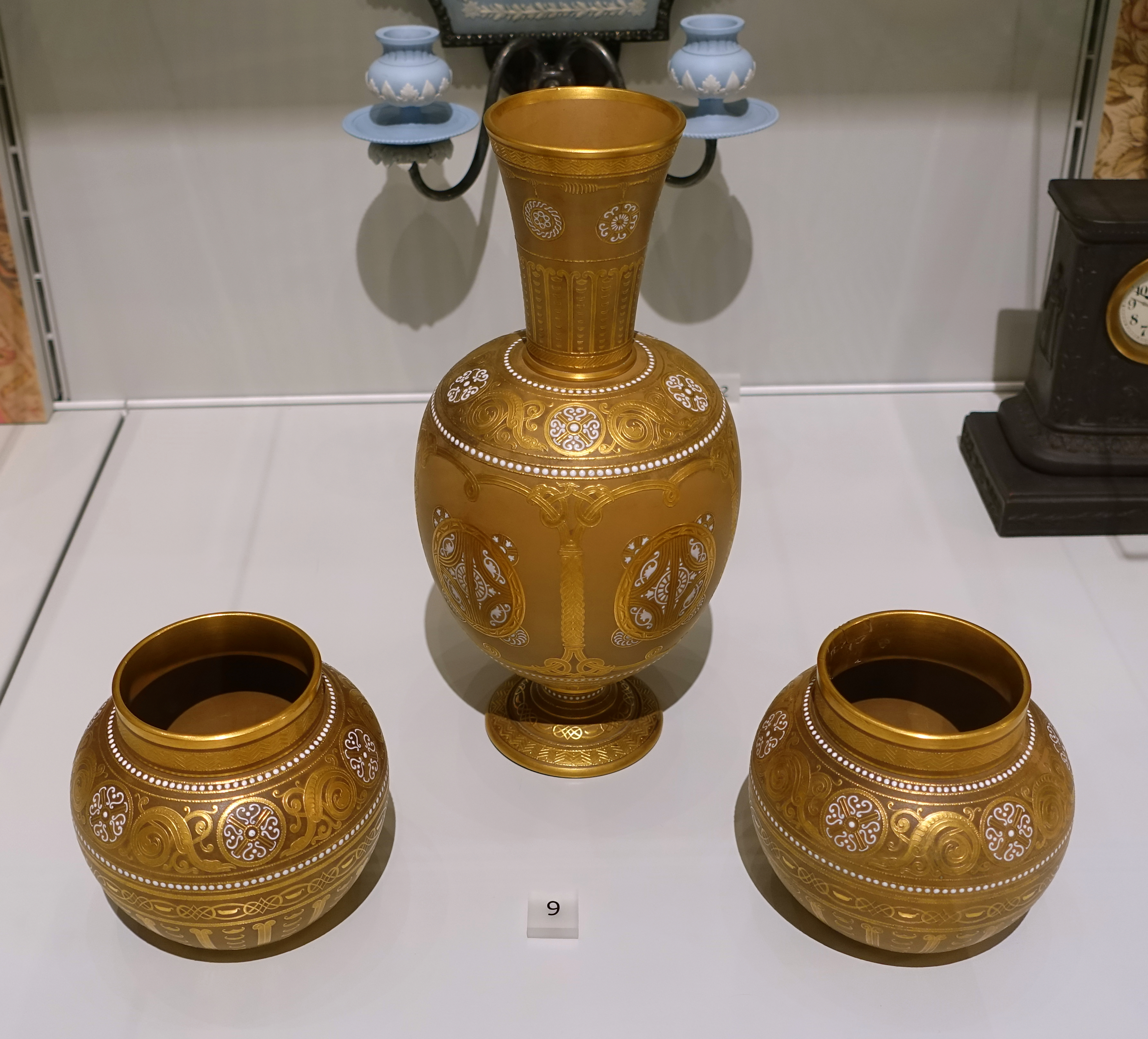
Vases with Celtic motifs, c. 1900, Caneware with raised gilding, by Wedgwood

The Irish Literary Revival encouraged the creation of works written in the spirit of Irish culture, as distinct from English culture. This style fed a growing Irish identity, which also found inspiration in Irish history, myths and folklore. There was an attempt to revitalize the native rhythm and music of Irish Gaelic. Figures such as Lady Gregory, W. B. Yeats, George Russell, J .M. Synge and Seán O'Casey wrote plays and articles about the political state of Ireland. Gaelic revival and Irish nationalism frequently overlapped in places such as An Stad, a tobacconist on Dublin's North Frederick Street owned by the writer Cathal McGarvey and frequented by literary figures like James Joyce and Yeats, along with leaders of the Nationalist movement such as Douglas Hyde, Arthur Griffith and Michael Collins. These were connected with another great symbol of the literary revival, the Abbey Theatre, which served as the stage for many new Irish writers and playwrights of the time.

In 1892, Sir Charles Gavan Duffy said,

A group of young men, among the most generous and disinterested in our annals, were busy digging up the buried relics of our history, to enlighten the present by a knowledge of the past, setting up on their pedestals anew the overthrown statues of Irish worthies, assailing wrongs which under long impunity had become unquestioned and even venerable, and warming as with strong wine the heart of the people, by songs of valour and hope; and happily not standing isolated in their pious work, but encouraged and sustained by just such an army of students and sympathizers as I see here to-day.

The Celtic Revival was an international movement. The Irish-American designer Thomas Augustus "Gus" O'Shaughnessy made a conscious choice to use Irish design roots in his artwork. Trained in stained glass and working in an Art Nouveau style, O'Shaughnessy designed a series of windows and interior stencils for Old Saint Patrick's Church in Chicago, a 10-year project begun in 1912. Louis Sullivan, the Chicago architect, incorporated dense Art Nouveau and Celtic-inspired interlace in the ornament of his buildings. Sullivan's father was a traditional Irish musician and they both were step-dancers. In England, the Watts Mortuary Chapel (1896–98) in Surrey was a thoroughgoing attempt to decorate a Romanesque Revival chapel framework with lavish Celtic reliefs designed by Mary Fraser Tytler.

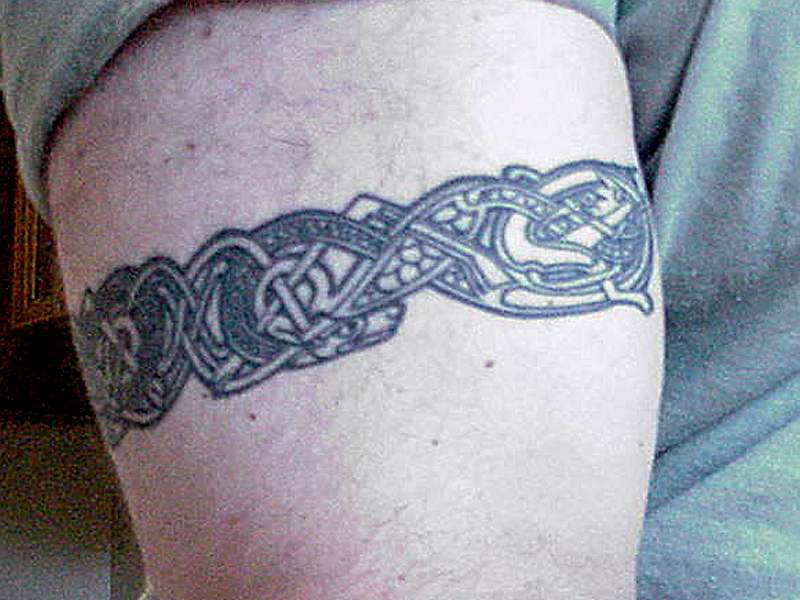
Celtic-style tattoo

The "plastic style" of early Celtic art was one of the elements feeding into Art Nouveau decorative style, very consciously so in the work of designers like the Manxman Archibald Knox, who did much work for Liberty & Co., especially for his Tudric and Cymric ranges of metalwork, respectively in pewter and silver or gold. Many of the most extravagant examples of the plastic style come from the modern Czech Lands and influenced the Czech Art Nouveau designer and artist Alphonse Mucha (Mucha, in turn, influenced the Irish-American O'Shaughnessy, who had attended a series of Mucha's lectures in Chicago). The interlace design motif remains popular in Celtic countries, above all Ireland where it is a national style signature. In recent decades, it had a re-revival in 1960s designs (for example, in the Biba logo) and has been used worldwide in tattoos and in various contexts and media in fantasy works with a quasi-Dark Ages setting. The Secret of Kells is an animated feature film of 2009 set during the creation of the Book of Kells which makes much use of Insular design.

In France, sublime descriptions of Celtic landscape were found in the works of Jacques Cambry. The Celtic Revival was strengthened by Napoleon's idea that the "French were a race of empire-building Celts," and became institutionalized by the foundation of the Académie Celtique in 1805, by Cambry and others.

John Duncan was one of the leading artists of the Celtic Revival and Symbolism. He was inspired by the early Italian Renaissance and made works in the medieval medium of tempera. He was a prolific artist working in a range of mediums including stained glass, illustrating and painting.

== Linguistic and cultural revivals, after 1920 ==
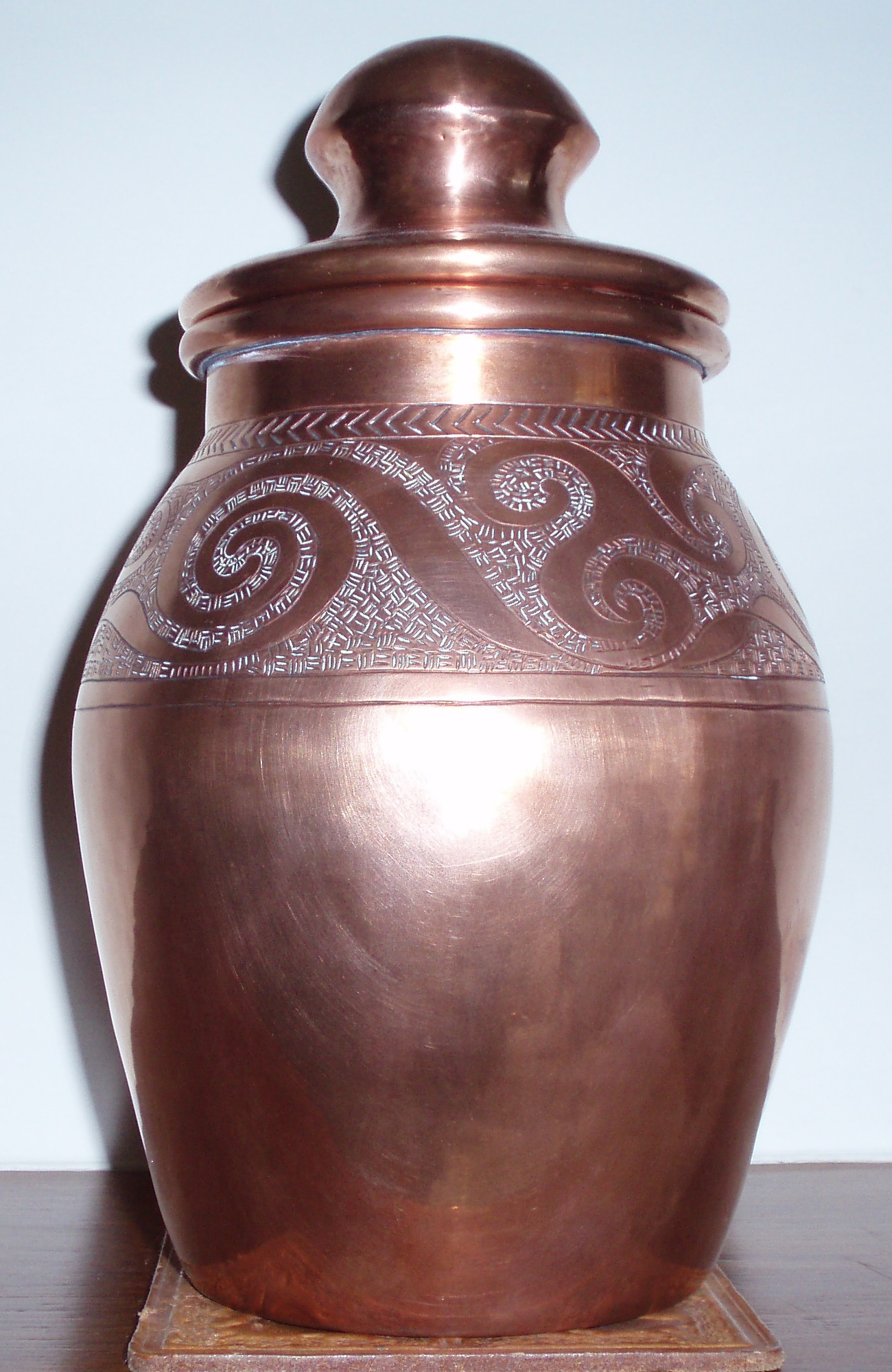
Modern copper jar with a Celtic motif.

=== In the Celtic nations ===
==== Brittany ====
In 1925, Professor Roparz Hemon founded the Breton-language review Gwalarn. During its 19-year run, Gwalarn tried to raise the language to the level of a great international language. Its publication encouraged the creation of original literature in all genres, and proposed Breton translations of internationally recognized foreign works. In 1946, Al Liamm replaced Gwalarn. Other Breton-language periodicals have been published, which established a fairly large body of literature for a minority language.

In 1977, Diwan schools were founded to teach Breton by immersion. They taught a few thousand young people from elementary school to high school. See the education section for more information.

The Asterix comic series has been translated into Breton. According to the comic, the Gaulish village where Asterix lives is in the Armorica peninsula, which is now Brittany. Some other popular comics have also been translated into Breton, including The Adventures of Tintin, Spirou, Titeuf, Hägar the Horrible, Peanuts and Yakari.

Some original media are created in Breton. The sitcom, Ken Tuch, is in Breton. Radio Kerne, broadcasting from Finistère, has exclusively Breton programming. Some movies (Lancelot du Lac, Shakespeare in Love, Marion du Faouet, Sezneg) and TV series (Columbo, Perry Mason) have also been translated and broadcast in Breton. Poets, singers, linguists, and writers who have written in Breton, including Yann-Ber Kalloc'h, Roparz Hemon, Anjela Duval, Xavier de Langlais, Pêr-Jakez Helias, Youenn Gwernig, Glenmor and Alan Stivell are now known internationally.

Today, Breton is the only living Celtic language that is not recognized by national government as an official or regional language.

The first Breton dictionary, the Catholicon, was also the first French dictionary. Edited by Jehan Lagadec in 1464, it was a trilingual work containing Breton, French and Latin. Today bilingual dictionaries have been published for Breton and languages including English, Dutch, German, Spanish and Welsh. A new generation is determined to gain international recognition for Breton. The monolingual dictionary, Geriadur Brezhoneg an Here (1995), defines Breton words in Breton. The first edition contained about 10,000 words, and the second edition of 2001 contains 20,000 words.

In the early 21st century, the Ofis ar Brezhoneg ("Office of the Breton language") began a campaign to encourage daily use of Breton in the region by both businesses and local communes. Efforts include installing bilingual signs and posters for regional events, as well as encouraging the use of the Spilhennig to let speakers identify each other. The office also started an Internationalization and localization policy asking Google, Firefox and SPIP to develop their interfaces in Breton. In 2004, the Breton Wikipedia started, which now counts more than 87,000 articles. In March 2007, the Ofis ar Brezhoneg signed a tripartite agreement with Regional Council of Brittany and Microsoft for the consideration of the Breton language in Microsoft products. In October 2014, Facebook added Breton as one of its 121 languages, after three years of talks between the Ofis and Facebook. On 27 June 2024, thanks to the use of Artificial Intelligence, Google Translate added Breton to its roster of available languages.

==== Cornwall ====
The Cornish cultural Celtic revival of the early twentieth century was characterised by an increased interest in the Cornish language started by Henry Jenner and Robert Morton Nance in 1904. The Federation of Old Cornwall Societies was formed in 1924 to "maintain the Celtic spirit of Cornwall", followed by the Gorseth Kernow in 1928 and the formation of the Cornish political party Mebyon Kernow in 1951.

==== Ireland ====
Due to the revival of Irish in educational settings and bilingual upbringing, there has been an increase in young Irish people speaking the language in the Republic of Ireland and Northern Ireland. It is said it is more common to hear it spoken in Irish cities. Additionally, there is a modest revived interest in North America in learning Irish.

==== Wales ====
The Welsh language has been spoken continuously in Wales throughout recorded history, and in recent centuries had been the most widely spoken Celtic language by far. By 1911 it had become a minority language, spoken by merely 43.5% of the Welsh population. While this decline continued over the following decades, the language did not die out. By the start of the 21st century, numbers began to increase once more.

The 2004 Welsh Language Use Survey showed that 21.7% of the population of Wales spoke Welsh, compared with 20.8% in the 2001 census, and 18.5% in 1991. The 2011 census, however, showed a slight decline to 562,000, or 19% of the population. The census also showed a "big drop" in the number of speakers in the Welsh-speaking heartlands, with the number dropping to under 50% in Ceredigion and Carmarthenshire for the first time. According to the Welsh Language Use Survey 2013-15, 24% of people aged three and over were able to speak Welsh.

Historically, large numbers of Welsh people spoke only Welsh. Over the course of the 20th century this monolingual population "all but disappeared", but a small percentage remained at the time of the 1981 census. In Wales, 16% of state school pupils now receive a Welsh medium education, and Welsh is a compulsory subject in English medium schools, up to the age of 15–16.

=== Americas ===
==== Welsh in Argentina ====
Welsh is spoken by over 5,000 people in Chubut province of Argentina. Some districts have recently incorporated it as an educational language.

==== Nova Scotia ====
Nova Scotia holds the largest population of Scots Gaelic speakers outside of Scotland.

=== Elsewhere in Europe ===
==== Cumbria ====
Celtic cultural revivals have spread towards Northern England, with the attempted reconstructions of numerous types of bagpipe (such as the Lancashire Great-pipe) and an increased interest in the Northumbrian smallpipes. There are also attempts to reconstruct the Cumbric language, the ancient Brythonic language of Northern (particularly Northwestern) England, a remnant of the Brittonic kingdoms of Hen Ogledd.

==== Devon ====
Celtic revival efforts in the early 2000's led to the creation and adoption of the Flag of Devon.

==== France ====
The Gaulish language used to be widely spoken in France and beyond around the period of the Roman Empire. There have been attempts at revivals and reconstructions, despite very limited evidence for the exact original form of the language. Eluveitie is a folk metal band that writes songs in revived form of Gaulish.

In Auvergne, chants are sung around bonfires remembering a Celtic god. There are also modern attempts to revive the polytheistic religion of the Gauls. Auvergne is also a hotpot for the Gaulish revival movement, being the location of numerous important Gaulish sites and the home of the legendary Gaulish warrior, Vercingetorix.

==== Galicia ====
There are small areas of Celtic revival in Galicia (Spain).

== See also ==
- Cuala Press
- Gaelic revival (Irish)
- Galician Institute for Celtic Studies
- Highland Revival
- Irish Literary Revival
- Modern Celts
- New religious movement
- Scottish Gaelic Renaissance
- Scottish Renaissance
