= Voiced dental and alveolar taps and flaps =

Consonantal sounds represented by ⟨ɾ⟩ in IPA

Voiced alveolar tap or flap

ɾ
- IPA number: 124

Audio sample
- source · help

Encoding
- Entity (decimal): &#638;
- Unicode (hex): U+027E
- X-SAMPA: 4
- Braille: ⠖ (braille pattern dots-235) ⠗ (braille pattern dots-1235)
Image

Voiced dental tap or flap

ɾ̪

Voiced postalveolar flap

ɾ̠

A voiced alveolar tap or flap is a type of consonantal sound, used in some spoken languages. The symbol in the International Phonetic Alphabet that represents a dental, alveolar, or postalveolar tap or flap is ⟨ɾ⟩.

The terms tap and flap are often used interchangeably. Peter Ladefoged proposed the distinction that a tap strikes its point of contact directly, as a very brief stop, and a flap strikes the point of contact tangentially: "Flaps are most typically made by retracting the tongue tip behind the alveolar ridge and moving it forward so that it strikes the ridge in passing." That distinction between the alveolar tap and flap could be written in non-standard IPA with the tap as ⟨ɾ⟩ and the flap as ⟨ɽ⟩, the retroflex letter being used for the one that starts with the tongue tip curled back behind the alveolar ridge, though it could be written less ambiguously with the Americanist letter ⟨ᴅ⟩ (or IPA ⟨d̮⟩) for the tap and standard IPA ⟨ɾ⟩ for the flap. The distinction is noticeable in the speech of some American English speakers in distinguishing the words "potty" ([ˈpɑɾi]) and "party" ([ˈpʰɑɚ̯ɽi]).

For linguists who do not make the distinction, alveolars and dentals are typically called taps and other articulations flaps. No language contrasts a tap and a flap at the same place of articulation.

As a phoneme, the sound is analyzed as a rhotic consonant. In languages for which the segment is present but not phonemic, it is often an allophone of either an alveolar stop ([t], [d], or both) or a rhotic consonant.

If an alveolar flap is the only rhotic consonant in the language, it may be transcribed with ⟨r⟩ in broad transcription, despite that symbol technically representing a trill.

A voiced alveolar tapped fricative is reported from some languages, which is a very brief voiced alveolar non-sibilant fricative.

== Features ==
Sagittal section of an alveolar flap (voicing not shown).

Features of a voiced alveolar tap or flap:

- Its manner of articulation is tap or flap, which means it is produced with a single contraction of the muscles so that one articulator (usually the tongue) is thrown against another.
- Its place of articulation can be dental or alveolar, which means it can be articulated behind upper front teeth or at the alveolar ridge. It is most often apical, which means that it is pronounced with the tip of the tongue.
- Its phonation is voiced, which means the vocal cords vibrate during the articulation.
- It is an oral consonant, which means that air is not allowed to escape through the nose.
- It is a median consonant, which means it is produced by directing the airstream down the midline of the tongue, rather than to the sides.
- Its airstream mechanism is pulmonic, which means it is articulated by pushing air only with the intercostal muscles and abdominal muscles, as in most speech sounds.

== Occurrence ==
=== Dental ===
Language	Word	IPA	Meaning	Notes
Uzbek	ёмғир / yomg‘ir / یامغیر	[ʝɒ̽mˈʁ̟ɨ̞ɾ̪]	'rain'	Denti-alveolar. See Uzbek phonology.

=== Alveolar ===
Language		Word	IPA	Meaning	Notes
Albanian	Standard	Shqipëri	[ʃc͡ɕipəˈɾi]	'Albania'	Contrasts with /r/ in all positions.
Arabic	Egyptian	رجل	[ɾeɡl]	'leg'	More commonly an alveolar trill. See Egyptian Arabic phonology.
Arabic	Lebanese	إجر	[ˈʔəʒəɾ]	'wages'	More commonly an alveolar trill.
Arabic	Moroccan	رما / rma	[ɾma]	'he threw'	More commonly an alveolar trill.
Arabic	South Iraqi	أريد	[aˈɾiːd]	'I want'	More commonly an alveolar trill.
Aragonese		aragonés	[äɾäɣ̞o̞ˈne̞s]	'Aragonese'	Contrasts with /r/.
Armenian	Eastern	րոպե	[ɾo̞pɛ̝́]	'minute'	Contrasts with /r/ in all positions.
Assyrian		ܪܫܐ / rìsha	[ɾiʃa]	'head'	
Asturian		hora	[ˈo̞ɾä]	'hour'	Contrasts with /r/.
Azerbaijani		qara / قارا	[ɡɑˈɾɑ]	'black'	
Basque		begiratu	[be̞ˈɣ̞iɾäˌt̪u]	'look'	Contrasts with /r/. See Basque phonology.
Bengali		ত্রিশ	[t̪ɾiʃ]	'dear'	Main realisation of /r/ phoneme. Also pronounced as [ɹ] or very rarely as [r], especially in word-initial positions. See Bengali phonology.
Breton	Trégor	Bro-Dreger	[bɾoˈdɾeːɡəɾ]	'land of Tregor'	
Catalan		truc	[ˈt̪ɾ̺uk]	'trick'	Apical. Contrasts with /r/. See Catalan phonology.
Danish		nordisk	[ˈnoɐ̯ɾisk]	'Nordic'	Possible realization of intervocalic /d/ between phonetic vowels. See Danish phonology.
Dutch		reden	[ˈɾeːdə(n)]	'reason'	Especially in the region of West Frisia. Realization of /r/ varies widely in Dutch. See Dutch phonology.
English	Cockney	better	[ˈbe̞ɾɐ]	'better'	Intervocalic allophone of /t/. In free variation with [ʔ ~ tʰ ~ tˢ]. See Flapping.
English	Australian	better	[ˈbeɾɐ]	'better'	Intervocalic allophone of /t/ and /d/. See Australian English phonology, New Zealand English phonology and Flapping.
English	New Zealand	better	[ˈbeɾɐ]	'better'	Intervocalic allophone of /t/ and /d/. See Australian English phonology, New Zealand English phonology and Flapping.
English	Dublin	better	[ˈbɛɾɚ]	'better'	Intervocalic allophone of /t/ and /d/, present in many dialects. In Local Dublin it can be [ɹ] instead, unlike New and Mainstream. See English phonology and Flapping.
English	North America	better	[ˈbɛɾɚ]	'better'	Intervocalic allophone of /t/ and /d/, present in many dialects. In Local Dublin it can be [ɹ] instead, unlike New and Mainstream. See English phonology and Flapping.
English	Ulster	better	[ˈbɛɾɚ]	'better'	Intervocalic allophone of /t/ and /d/, present in many dialects. In Local Dublin it can be [ɹ] instead, unlike New and Mainstream. See English phonology and Flapping.
English	West Country	better	[ˈbɛɾɚ]	'better'	Intervocalic allophone of /t/ and /d/, present in many dialects. In Local Dublin it can be [ɹ] instead, unlike New and Mainstream. See English phonology and Flapping.
Esperanto		Esperanto	[espeˈɾanto]	'one who hopes'	Usually a flap [ɾ], but can be a trilled r, depending on speaker. See Esperanto phonology.
Finnish		rotta	[ˈɾo̞t̪ːɑ]	'rat'	Occurs in Häme (Tampere) dialect, contrasts with r in standard Finnish. See Finnish phonology.
Hindustani		मेरा/میرا	[ˈmeːɾäː]	'my'	Allophone of /r/ in intervocalic position. See Hindustani phonology.
Hungarian		kar	[ˈkɒɾ]	'arm'	Allophone of /r/. See Hungarian phonology.
Irish		fear	[fʲaɾˠ]	'man'	See Irish phonology.
Italian	Standard	era	[ˈɛːɾä]	'era'	Intervocalic realization of /r/.
Italian	Sicilian	drago	[ˈdɾaːɡu]	'dragon'	
Kinyarwanda		u Rwanda	[u‿ɾgwɑːⁿdɑ]	'Rwanda'	
Japanese		心 /こころ kokoro	[ko̞ko̞ɾo̞ꜜ]	'heart'	Varies with [ɺ]. See Japanese phonology.
Kazakh		бер / ber /بەر	[be̞ɾ]	'give'	In free variation with trilled /r/. See Kazakh phonology.
Korean		여름 / yeoreum	[jʌ̹̀ɾɯ́m]	'summer'	Allophone of /l/ between vowels or between a vowel and an /h/. See Korean phonology.
Kyrgyz		кырк/قىرق / kyrk	[qɯɾq]	'forty'	See Kyrgyz phonology.
Malay		راتوس / ratus	[ɾä.tos]	'hundred'	Common realization of /r/. May be a trilled [r] or postalveolar approximant [ɹ̠]. See Malay phonology.
Malayalam		വര/vara	[ʋɐɾɐ]	'line' or 'drawing'	See Malayalam phonology
Māori		whare	[ˈɸaɾɛ]	'house'	Sometimes trilled.
Marathi		वारा	[ʋaːɾaː]	'wind'	
Nepali		तारा	[t̪äɾä]	'star'	Intervocalic allophone of /r/. See Nepali phonology.
Norwegian		bare	[ˈbɑ̂ːɾə]	'only'	May be realised as a trill [r], approximant [ɹ] or uvular [ʀ~ʁ] depending on dialect. See Norwegian phonology.
Odia		ରାତି / rāti	[ɾäti]	'night'	
Polish		który	[ˈkt̪uɾɘ̟]	'which'	Common realization of /r/. See Polish phonology.
Portuguese		prato	[ˈpɾatʊ]	'dish'	Dental to retroflex allophones, varying by dialect. Contrasts only intervocalically with /ʁ/, with its guttural allophones. See Portuguese phonology.
Punjabi	Gurmukhi	ਲਾਰਾ	[ˈläːɾäː]	'false promise'	See Punjabi phonology.
Punjabi	Shahmukhi	لارا	[ˈläːɾäː]	'false promise'	See Punjabi phonology.
Scottish Gaelic		mòr	[moːɾ]	'big'	Both the lenited and non-initial broad form of r. Often transcribed simply as /r/. The initial unlenited broad form is a trill [rˠ], while the slender form is [ɾʲ] ([ð] in some dialects). See Scottish Gaelic phonology.
Spanish		caro	[ˈkaɾo̞]	'expensive'	Contrasts with /r/. See Spanish phonology.
Tagalog		biro	[ˈbiɾɔʔ]	'joke'	See Tagalog phonology.
Tamil		மரம் / maram	[mɐɾɐ́m]	'tree'	See Tamil phonology.
Thai	Some speakers	พระ / phrá	[pʰɾäʔ˦˥]	'monk'	
Turkish		ara	[ɑˈɾɑ]	'interval'	Intervocalically; may not make full contact elsewhere. See Turkish phonology.
Turkmen		gara / گارا	[ɢɑˈɾɑ]	'black'	
West Coast Bajau		baraꞌ	[ba.ɾaʔ]	'to tell'	Voiced dental flap in intervocalic position.
Wu Chinese	Xuanzhou Wu	銅陵	[ɾom.lin]	'Tongling'	Found in various Xuanzhou localities, with that of Tongling provided. Tones not notated due to complexity of tone sandhi. Equivalent to /d/ in other lects.

=== Postalveolar ===
Language	Word	IPA	Meaning	Notes
Angami	ra	[ɾ̠ä]	'village'	
Bengali	গাড়ি	[ˈɡɐɾ̠iˑ]	'car'	Apical postalveolar flaps; contrasts unaspirated and aspirated forms. See Bengali phonology.
Gokana	bele	[beːɾ̠eː]	'we'	Apical postalveolar. Allophone of /l/, medially between vowels within the morpheme, and finally in the morpheme before a following vowel in the same word. It can be a postalveolar trill or simply [l] instead.
Greek	μηρός / mirós	[miˈɾ̠o̞s̠]	'thigh'	Somewhat retracted. Most common realization of /r/. See Modern Greek phonology.
Hindustani	बड़ा/بڑا	[ˈbɐɾ̠äː]	'big'	Apical postalveolar flaps; contrasts unaspirated and aspirated forms. See Hindustani phonology.
Nepali	भाड़ा	[bʱäɾ̠ä]	'rent'	Apical postalveolar flaps; postvocalic allophone of /ɖ, ɖʱ/. See Nepali phonology.
Odia	ଗାଡ଼ି	[ɡäɾ̠iː]	'car'	Apical postalveolar flaps; postvocalic allophone of /ɖ, ɖʱ/.
Shipibo	roro	[ˈɾ̠o̽ɾ̠o̽]	'to break'	Apical postalveolar; possible realization of /r/.

== Alveolar nasal tap and flap ==
Alveolar nasal tap/flap

ɾ̃

n̆
- IPA number: 124 424

Audio sample
- source · help

Encoding
- X-SAMPA: 4~ or n_X

=== Features ===
Features of an alveolar nasal tap or flap:

- Its manner of articulation is tap or flap, which means it is produced with a single contraction of the muscles so that one articulator (usually the tongue) is thrown against another.
- Its place of articulation is alveolar, which means it is articulated with either the tip or the blade of the tongue at the alveolar ridge, termed respectively apical and laminal.
- Its phonation is voiced, which means the vocal cords vibrate during the articulation.
- It is a nasal consonant, which means air is exclusively allowed to escape through the nose for nasal stops; otherwise, in addition to through the mouth.
- It is a median consonant, which means it is produced by directing the airstream down the midline of the tongue, rather than to the sides.
- Its airstream mechanism is pulmonic, which means it is articulated by pushing air only with the intercostal muscles and abdominal muscles, as in most speech sounds.

=== Occurrence ===
Language		Word	IPA	Meaning	Notes
English	Estuary	twenty	[ˈtʰw̥ɛ̃ɾ̃i]	'twenty'	Allophone of unstressed intervocalic /nt/ for some speakers, especially in rapid or casual speech. See English phonology, North American English regional phonology and flapping
English	North American	twenty	[ˈtʰw̥ɛ̃ɾ̃i]	'twenty'	Allophone of unstressed intervocalic /nt/ for some speakers, especially in rapid or casual speech. See English phonology, North American English regional phonology and flapping
Guarani		porã	[põˈɾ̃ã]	'good'	Nasalized allophone of /ɾ/ as a result of nasal harmony. See Guarani language § Nasal harmony

== See also ==
- Flapping
- Index of phonetics articles

== Notes ==
Place →	Labial					Coronal										Dorsal					Laryngeal			
Manner ↓	Bilabial		Labiodental		Linguolabial		Dental		Alveolar		Postalveolar		Retroflex		(Alveolo-)palatal		Velar		Uvular		Pharyngeal/epiglottal		Glottal	
Nasal	m̥	m	ɱ̊	ɱ		n̼	n̪̊	n̪	n̥	n	n̠̊	n̠	ɳ̊	ɳ	ɲ̊	ɲ	ŋ̊	ŋ	ɴ̥	ɴ				
Plosive	p	b	p̪	b̪	t̼	d̼	t̪	d̪	t	d			ʈ	ɖ	c	ɟ	k	ɡ	q	ɢ	ʡ		ʔ	
Sibilant affricate							t̪s̪	d̪z̪	ts	dz	t̠ʃ	d̠ʒ	tʂ	dʐ	tɕ	dʑ								
Non-sibilant affricate	pɸ	bβ	p̪f	b̪v			t̪θ	d̪ð	tɹ̝̊	dɹ̝	t̠ɹ̠̊˔	d̠ɹ̠˔			cç	ɟʝ	kx	ɡɣ	qχ	ɢʁ	ʡʜ	ʡʢ	ʔh	
Sibilant fricative							s̪	z̪	s	z	ʃ	ʒ	ʂ	ʐ	ɕ	ʑ								
Non-sibilant fricative	ɸ	β	f	v	θ̼	ð̼	θ	ð	θ̠	ð̠	ɹ̠̊˔	ɹ̠˔	ɻ̊˔	ɻ˔	ç	ʝ	x	ɣ	χ	ʁ	ħ	ʕ	h	ɦ
Approximant		β̞		ʋ				ð̞		ɹ		ɹ̠		ɻ		j		ɰ						˷
Tap/flap		ⱱ̟		ⱱ					ɾ̥	ɾ			ɽ̊	ɽ						ɢ̆		ʡ̆		
Trill	ʙ̥	ʙ							r̥	r		r̠	ɽ̊r̥	ɽr					ʀ̥	ʀ	ʜ	ʢ		
Lateral affricate									tɬ	dɮ			tꞎ	d𝼅	c𝼆	ɟʎ̝	k𝼄	ɡʟ̝						
Lateral fricative							ɬ̪		ɬ	ɮ			ꞎ	𝼅	𝼆	ʎ̝	𝼄	ʟ̝						
Lateral approximant								l̪	l̥	l		l̠	ɭ̊	ɭ	ʎ̥	ʎ	ʟ̥	ʟ		ʟ̠				
Lateral tap/flap									ɺ̥	ɺ			𝼈̊	𝼈		ʎ̆		ʟ̆						

		BL	LD	D	A	PA	RF	P	V	U
Implosive	Voiced	ɓ			ɗ		ᶑ	ʄ	ɠ	ʛ
Implosive	Voiceless	ɓ̥			ɗ̥		ᶑ̊	ʄ̊	ɠ̊	ʛ̥
Ejective	Stop	pʼ			tʼ		ʈʼ	cʼ	kʼ	qʼ
Ejective	Affricate		p̪fʼ	tθʼ	tsʼ	tʃʼ	tʂʼ	tɕʼ	kxʼ	qχʼ
Ejective	Fricative	ɸʼ	fʼ	θʼ	sʼ	ʃʼ	ʂʼ	ɕʼ	xʼ	χʼ
Ejective	Lateral affricate				tɬʼ			c𝼆ʼ	k𝼄ʼ	q𝼄ʼ
Ejective	Lateral fricative				ɬʼ					
Click (top: velar; bottom: uvular)	Tenuis	kʘ qʘ		kǀ qǀ	kǃ qǃ		k𝼊 q𝼊	kǂ qǂ		
Click (top: velar; bottom: uvular)	Voiced	ɡʘ ɢʘ		ɡǀ ɢǀ	ɡǃ ɢǃ		ɡ𝼊 ɢ𝼊	ɡǂ ɢǂ		
Click (top: velar; bottom: uvular)	Nasal	ŋʘ ɴʘ		ŋǀ ɴǀ	ŋǃ ɴǃ		ŋ𝼊 ɴ𝼊	ŋǂ ɴǂ	ʞ	
Click (top: velar; bottom: uvular)	Tenuis lateral				kǁ qǁ					
Click (top: velar; bottom: uvular)	Voiced lateral				ɡǁ ɢǁ					
Click (top: velar; bottom: uvular)	Nasal lateral				ŋǁ ɴǁ					
