= Old St. Patrick's Church (Chicago) =

Historic church in Illinois, United States

- St. Patrick's Roman Catholic Church
- U.S. National Register of Historic Places
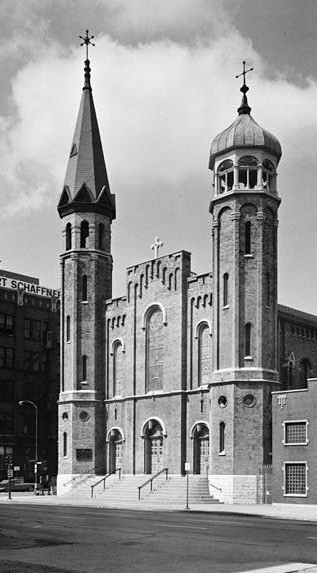
- Old St. Patrick's in 1963

- Location within Chicago metropolitan area Location within Illinois Location within the United States
- Location: Chicago, Illinois
- Coordinates: 41°52′45″N 87°38′40″W
- Built: 1854
- Architect: Carter & Bauer
- Architectural style: Romanesque
- NRHP reference No.: 77000481
- Added to NRHP: July 15, 1977

Old St. Patrick's Church, also known as St. Patrick's Roman Catholic Church and commonly known as Old St. Pat's, is a Roman Catholic parish in Chicago, Illinois. Located at 700 West Adams Street, it has been described as the "cornerstone of Irish culture" in Chicago. The main church building is one of a handful of structures remaining in the city that predate the 1871 Great Chicago Fire, and is the city's oldest standing church building.

== History ==
The church from the back

Old St. Patrick's Church was founded on Easter Sunday, April 12, 1846. The parish was originally housed in a wooden building at Randolph Street and Des Plaines Street. In the 1850s, the present church building was constructed of yellow Cream City brick from Milwaukee. Two octagonal spires, said to represent the Eastern Church and the Western Church, were added in 1885. By the 1880s, most of the parish was composed of Irish-Americans, and from 1912 through 1922, the interior was redecorated by Thomas A. O'Shaughnessy and others in the Celtic Revival style. O'Shaugnessy modeled some of the ornamentation after the illuminations found in the Book of Kells. The building was added to the National Register of Historic Places in 1977.

Today, Old St. Pat's is known for hosting an annual summer block party, which it describes as the "world's largest".

Fr. Thomas J. Hurley was appointed as the pastor of Old St. Patrick's Church in 2007. He served until March 2021. Father Kenneth Simpson was subsequently appointed as parish administrator, and in 2022, Fr. Patrick McGrath was appointed as Hurley's full-time replacement.
