= Spilhennig =

2017 logo for speakers of Breton

"Spilhennig", the mark of Breton speakers.

Spilhennig is a logo created in 2007 for speakers of Breton by the Office of the Breton Language. The logo was created to be worn such that those that speak the language can recognize other speakers and converse in it, rather than converse out of ignorance in the majority language of the Breton region, French. The logo is designed to look like a wave, representing modern-day Breton, and an eye, representing the logo's ability to allow speakers to visually see other speakers.
