= Thomas A. O'Shaughnessy =

Thomas Augustin "Gus" O'Shaughnessy (1870-1956) was an Irish American Celtic Revival designer from Missouri who worked primarily in stained glass. He was employed as a Chicago Daily News staff artist and had earlier studied under stained glass master Louis Millet at the Art Institute of Chicago, then traveled to Europe to perfect his art. O'Shaughnessy, who was a member of Chicago's Palette and Chisel Academy of Fine Art, is best remembered for having created the greatest examples of Celtic Revival architectural design in America.

O'Shaughnessy designed and installed 15 stained glass windows at Old St. Patrick's Church at Desplaines and Adams streets, in Chicago between 1912 and 1922 and executed the detailed interlace stenciling used throughout the interior. The 15 major windows include a balcony triptych done with a blend of Art Nouveau and Celtic Revival styles. This trio represents the three virtues of Faith, Hope and Charity. The central window of the triptych memorializes Irish patriot Terence MacSwiney, Lord Mayor of Cork, who died during a hunger strike protesting his internment by the British presence in Ireland. Art historian Rolf Achilles, adjunct associate professor, historic preservation at the School of the Art Institute of Chicago and curator of the Smith Museum of Stained Glass Windows, Chicago, called the highly intricate MacSwiney window "arguably the finest window of its type in the Midwest." The MacSwiney window contains more than 250,000 pieces of glass in 2,000 colors and no paint, a measure of O'Shaughnessy's high level of accomplishment in his craft by the time he installed that window, the last of the 15 main windows at the church (he also supplied several smaller, lesser inset stained glass windows with Celtic patterns above doors and in stairwells).

O'Shaughnessy was initially inspired by the Celtic art exhibit at the World's Columbian Exposition of 1893. According to the Encyclopedia of Chicago:

... [T]hanks to the genius of artist Thomas A. O'Shaughnessy, St. Patrick's was transformed, between 1912 and 1922, into the best-known example of Celtic Revival Art in America. Drawing inspiration from the ninth-century illuminated manuscript known as the Book of Kells, O'Shaughnessy created luminescent stained-glass windows and interlace stencils. Restored to their original beauty in 1996, O'Shaughnessy's designs continue to challenge conventional notions of Irish identity and sacred space.
