= Breton language =

Celtic language spoken in France

Breton
- brezhoneg
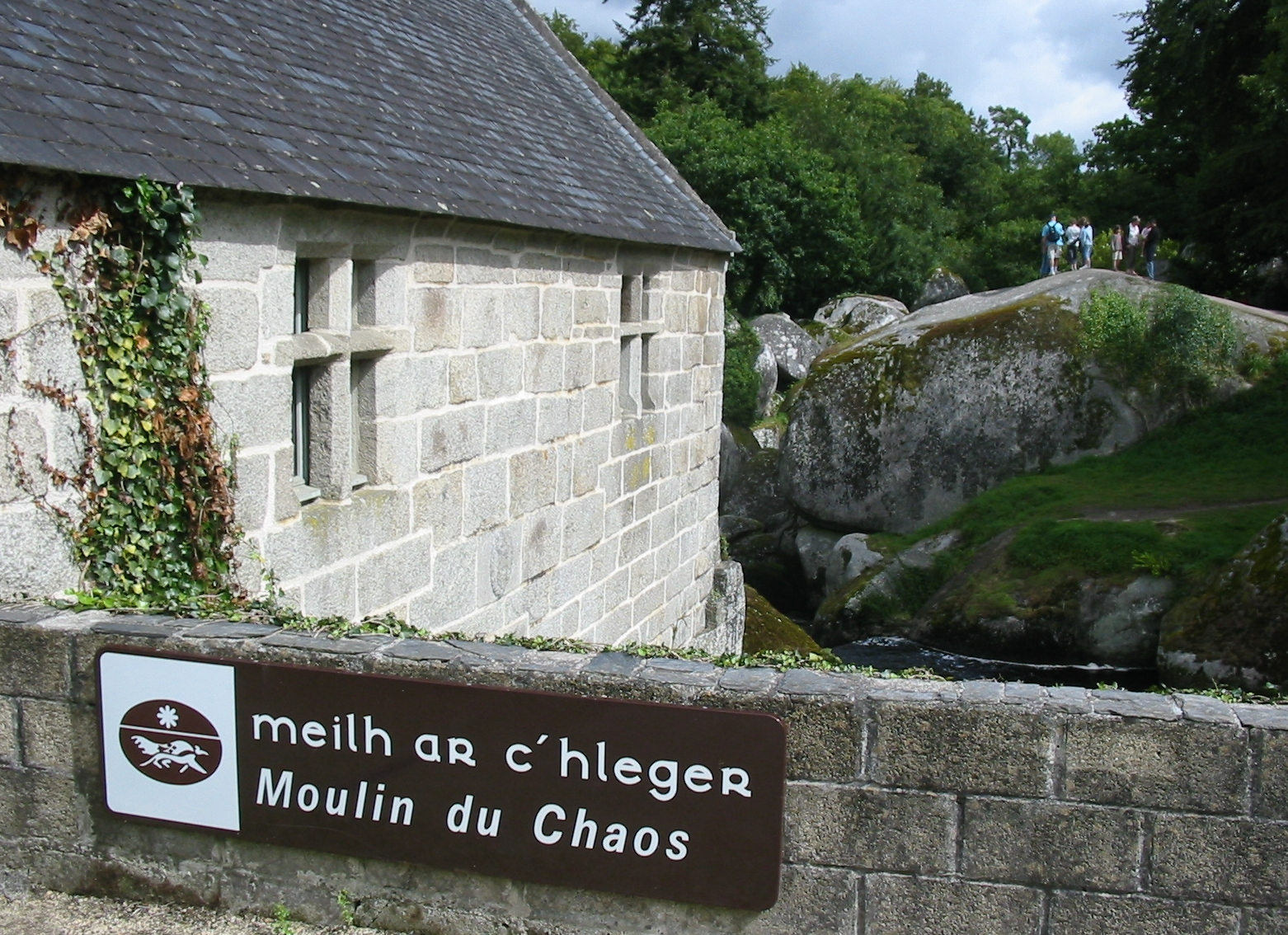
- Bilingual sign in Huelgoat in Brittany
- Pronunciation: [bʁeˈzɔ̃ːnɛk], [brəhɔ̃ˈnek]
- Native to: Brittany (France)
- Region: Lower Brittany
- Ethnicity: Bretons
- Native speakers: 107,000 in Brittany (2024)
- Language family: Indo-European: Celtic; Insular Celtic or Gallo-Brittonic; Brittonic; Southwestern Brittonic; Breton
- Dialects: Gwenedeg; Kerneveg; Leoneg; Tregerieg; Gwerranneg †; Goueleg
- Writing system: Latin script (Breton alphabet)

Official status
- Recognised minority language in: France: Brittany
- Regulated by: Ofis Publik ar Brezhoneg

Language codes
- ISO 639-1: br
- ISO 639-2: bre
- ISO 639-3: bre – inclusive code Modern Breton; Individual codes: xbm – Middle Breton obt – Old Breton
- Glottolog: bret1245 Bretonic bret1244 KLT Breton vann1244 Gwenedeg
- ELP: Breton
- Linguasphere: 50-ABB-b (varieties: 50-ABB-ba to -be)
- Percentage of Breton speakers in each region of Brittany, 2018

- Breton is classified as Severely Endangered by the UNESCO Atlas of the World's Languages in Danger.

A man speaking Breton

Breton (Note: /ˈbrɛtən/, BRET-ən; French: [bʁətɔ̃]; endonym: brezhoneg [bʁeˈzɔ̃ːnɛk] or [bɾəhɔ̃ˈnek] in Morbihan) is a Southwestern Brittonic language of the Celtic language group spoken in Brittany, part of modern-day France. It is the only Celtic language still in use on the European mainland.

Breton is an Insular Celtic/Gallo-Brittonic language that was brought from Great Britain to Brittany by migrating Britons during the Early Middle Ages, which makes Breton most closely related to Cornish, another Southwestern Brittonic language. Welsh and Cumbric, both Western Brittonic languages, are more distantly related, and with the Gaulish because of the Armorican Gauls substrate.

Having declined from more than one million speakers around 1950 to 107,000 in 2024, Breton is classified as "severely endangered" by the UNESCO Atlas of the World's Languages in Danger. The number of children attending bilingual classes rose 33% between 2006 and 2012 to 14,709.

== History and status ==
Breton is spoken in Lower Brittany (Breton: Breizh-Izel), roughly to the west of a line linking Plouha (west of Saint-Brieuc) and La Roche-Bernard (east of Vannes). It comes from a Brittonic language community that once extended from Great Britain to Armorica (present-day Brittany) and had even established a toehold in Galicia (in present-day Spain). Old Breton is attested from the 9th century. It was the language of the upper classes until the 12th century after which it became the language of commoners in Lower Brittany. The nobility, followed by the bourgeoisie, adopted French. The written language of the Duchy of Brittany was Latin until it switched to French in the 15th century. There is a limited tradition of Breton literature. Some philosophical and scientific terms in Modern Breton come from Old Breton. The recognized stages of the Breton language are Old Breton – c. 800 to c. 1100, Middle Breton – c. 1100 to c. 1650, Modern Breton – c. 1650 to present.

The French monarchy was not concerned with the minority languages of France, which were spoken by the lower classes, and required the use of French for government business as part of its policy of national unity. During the French Revolution, the government introduced policies favouring French over the regional languages, which it pejoratively referred to as patois. The revolutionaries assumed that reactionary and monarchist forces preferred regional languages to keep the peasant masses underinformed. In 1794, Bertrand Barère submitted his "report on the patois" to the Committee of Public Safety in which he said that "federalism and superstition speak Breton".

Under the Third, Fourth and early Fifth Republics, the French government attempted to stamp out regional languages—including Breton—in state schools, in an effort to build a unified national culture. Teachers humiliated students for using their regional languages, and such practices prevailed until the late 1960s.

In the early 21st century, the political centralization of France, the influence of the media and the increasing mobility of people have caused only about 200,000 people to be active speakers of Breton, a dramatic decline from more than 1 million in 1950. Most of today's speakers are more than 60 years old, and Breton is now classified as an endangered language.

In the early 20th century, half of the population of Lower Brittany knew only Breton; the other half were bilingual. By 1950, there were only 100,000 monolingual Bretons, and the rapid decline has continued, with likely no monolingual speakers left today. A statistical survey in 1997 found around 300,000 speakers in Lower Brittany of whom about 190,000 were aged 60 or older. Few 15-to-19-year-olds spoke Breton. In 1993, parents were finally legally allowed to give their children Breton names.

== Revival efforts ==
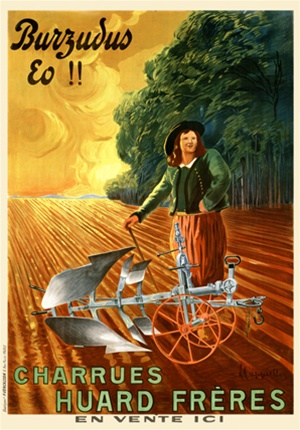
1911 poster with Breton slogan, Burzudus eo!! ("It's miraculous!!")

In 1925, Professor Roparz Hemon founded the Breton-language review Gwalarn. During its 19-year run, Gwalarn tried to raise the language to the level of a great international language. Its publication encouraged the creation of original literature in all genres, and proposed Breton translations of internationally recognized foreign works. In 1946, Al Liamm replaced Gwalarn. Other Breton-language periodicals have been published, which established a fairly large body of literature for a minority language.

In 1977, Diwan schools were founded to teach Breton by immersion. Since their establishment, Diwan schools have provided fully-immersive primary school and partially-immersive secondary school instruction in Breton for thousands of students across Brittany. This has directly contributed to the growing numbers of school-age speakers of Breton.

The Asterix comic series has been translated into Breton. According to the comic, the Gaulish village where Asterix lives is in the Armorica peninsula, which is now Brittany. Some other popular comics have also been translated into Breton, including The Adventures of Tintin, Spirou, Titeuf, Hägar the Horrible, Peanuts and Yakari.

Some original media are created in Breton. The sitcom Ken Tuch is in Breton. Radio Kerne, broadcasting from Finistère, has exclusively Breton programming. Some movies (Lancelot du Lac, Shakespeare in Love, Marion du Faouet, Sezneg) and TV series (Columbo, Perry Mason) have also been translated and broadcast in Breton. Poets, singers, linguists, and writers who have written in Breton, including Yann-Ber Kalloc'h, Roparz Hemon, Añjela Duval, Xavier de Langlais, Pêr-Jakez Helias, Youenn Gwernig, Glenmor, Vefa de Saint-Pierre and Alan Stivell are now known internationally.

Today, Breton is the only living Celtic language that is not recognized by a national government as an official or regional language.

The first Breton dictionary, the Catholicon, was also the first French dictionary. Edited by Jehan Lagadec in 1464, it was a trilingual work containing Breton, French and Latin. Today bilingual dictionaries have been published for Breton and languages including English, Dutch, German, Spanish and Welsh. A monolingual dictionary, Geriadur Brezhoneg an Here was published in 1995. The first edition contained about 10,000 words, and the second edition of 2001 contains 20,000 words.

In the early 21st century, the Ofis Publik ar Brezhoneg ("Public Office for the Breton language") began a campaign to encourage daily use of Breton in the region by both businesses and local communes. Efforts include installing bilingual signs and posters for regional events, as well as encouraging the use of the Spilhennig to let speakers identify each other. The office also started an Internationalization and localization policy asking Google, Firefox and SPIP to develop their interfaces in Breton. In 2004, the Breton Wikipedia launched, which counts over 91,000 articles as of September 2026. In March 2007, the Ofis ar Brezhoneg signed a tripartite agreement with Regional Council of Brittany and Microsoft for the consideration of the Breton language in Microsoft products. In October 2014, Facebook added Breton as one of its 121 languages after three years of talks between the Ofis and Facebook.

France has twice chosen to enter the Eurovision Song Contest with songs in Breton; once in 1996 in Oslo with "Diwanit bugale" by Dan Ar Braz and the fifty piece band Héritage des Celtes, and most recently in 2022 in Turin with "Fulenn" by Alvan Morvan Rosius and vocal trio Ahez. These are two of five times France has chosen songs in one of its minority languages for the contest, the others being in 1992 (bilingual French and Antillean Creole), 1993 (bilingual French and Corsican), and 2011 (Corsican).

== Geographic distribution and dialects ==
Dialects of Breton

Breton is spoken mainly in Lower Brittany but also in a more dispersed way in Upper Brittany (where it is spoken alongside Gallo and French), and in areas around the world that have Breton emigrants.

The four traditional dialects of Breton correspond to medieval bishoprics, rather than to linguistic divisions. They are leoneg (léonard, of the county of Léon), tregerieg (trégorrois, of Trégor), kerneveg (cornouaillais, of Cornouaille), and gwenedeg (vannetais, of Vannes). Gwerranneg (guérandais, of Guérande) was spoken up to the beginning of the 20th century in the region of Guérande and Batz-sur-Mer. There are no clear boundaries between the dialects because they form a dialect continuum and vary only slightly from one village to the next. Gwenedeg, however, requires a little study to be intelligible with most of the other dialects. Due to this difficulty in intelligibility, the Glottolog project split the Gwenedeg dialects into a separate language entry from the KLT Breton dialects in v5.2 under the name Vannetais.

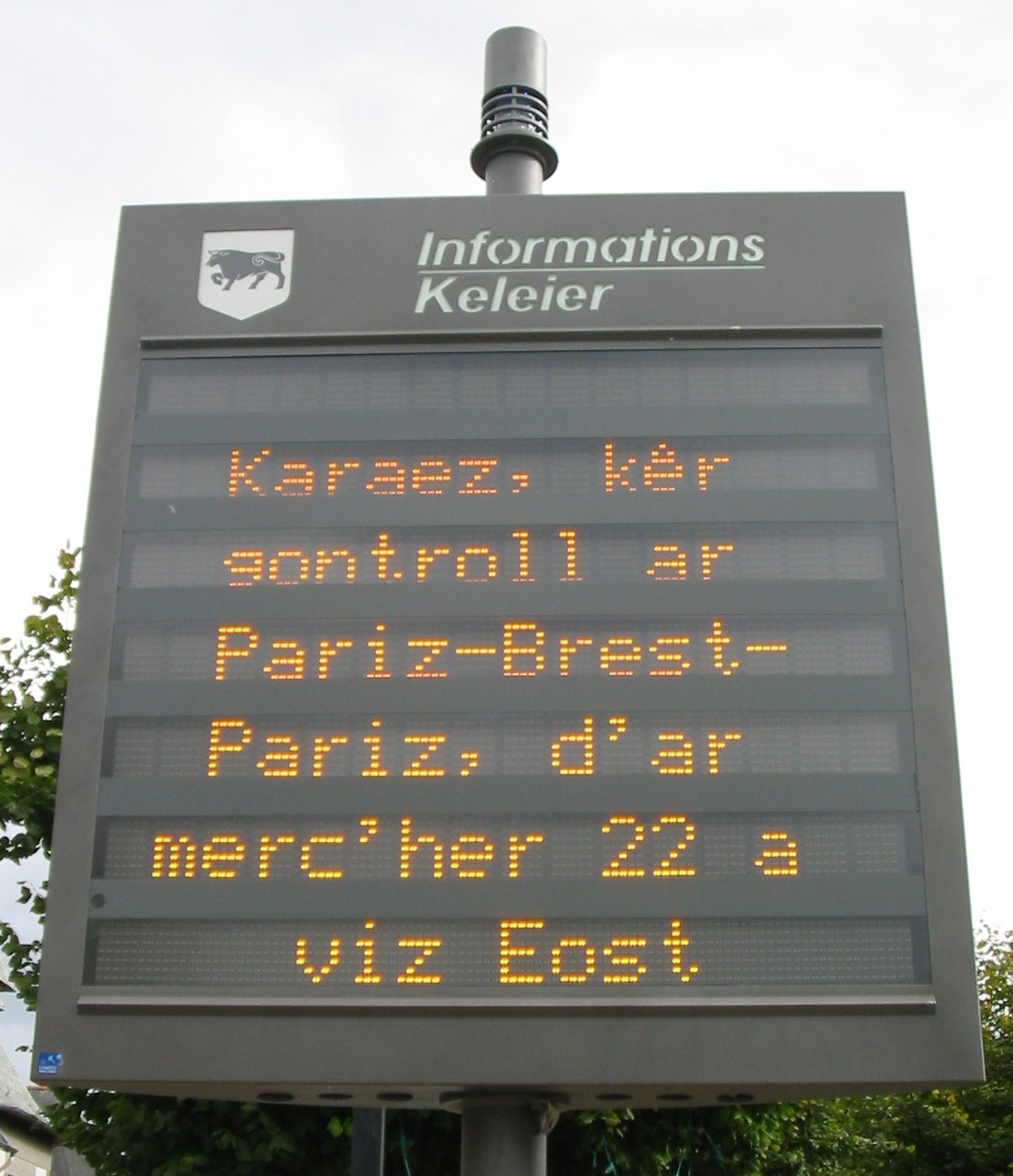
Electronic information sign in Breton, Carhaix

Distribution of Breton speakers by region (statistics based on around the year 2010)
| Region | Total Population | Breton speakers | |
| Region | Total Population | Number | Percentage |
|---|---|---|---|
| Basse Bretagne | 1,300,000 | 185,000 | 14% |
| Centre Ouest Bretagne | 112,000 | 20,000 | 18% |
| Trégor-Goelo | 127,000 | 25,000 | 20% |
| Pays de Brest | 370,000 | 40,000 | 11% |
| Pays de Cornouaille | 320,000 | 35,000 | 11% |
| Pays de Lorient | 212,000 | 15,000 | 7% |
| Pays de Vannes | 195,000 | 11,000 | 6% |
| Pays de Guingamp | 76,000 | 12,000 | 17% |
| Pays de Morlaix | 126,000 | 15,000 | 12% |
| Pays de St Brieuc | 191,000 | 5,000 | 3% |
| Pays de Pontivy | 85,000 | 6,500 | 8% |
| Pays d'Auray | 85,000 | 6,500 | 8% |
| Haute Bretagne | 1,900,000 | 20,000 | 1% |
| Pays de Rennes | 450,000 | 7,000 | 2% |
| Loire-Atlantique | 1,300,000 | <1,000 | <1% |
| Pays de Nantes | 580,000 | 4,000 | 1% |
| TOTAL | 4,560,000 | 216,000 | 4.7% |

== Official status ==
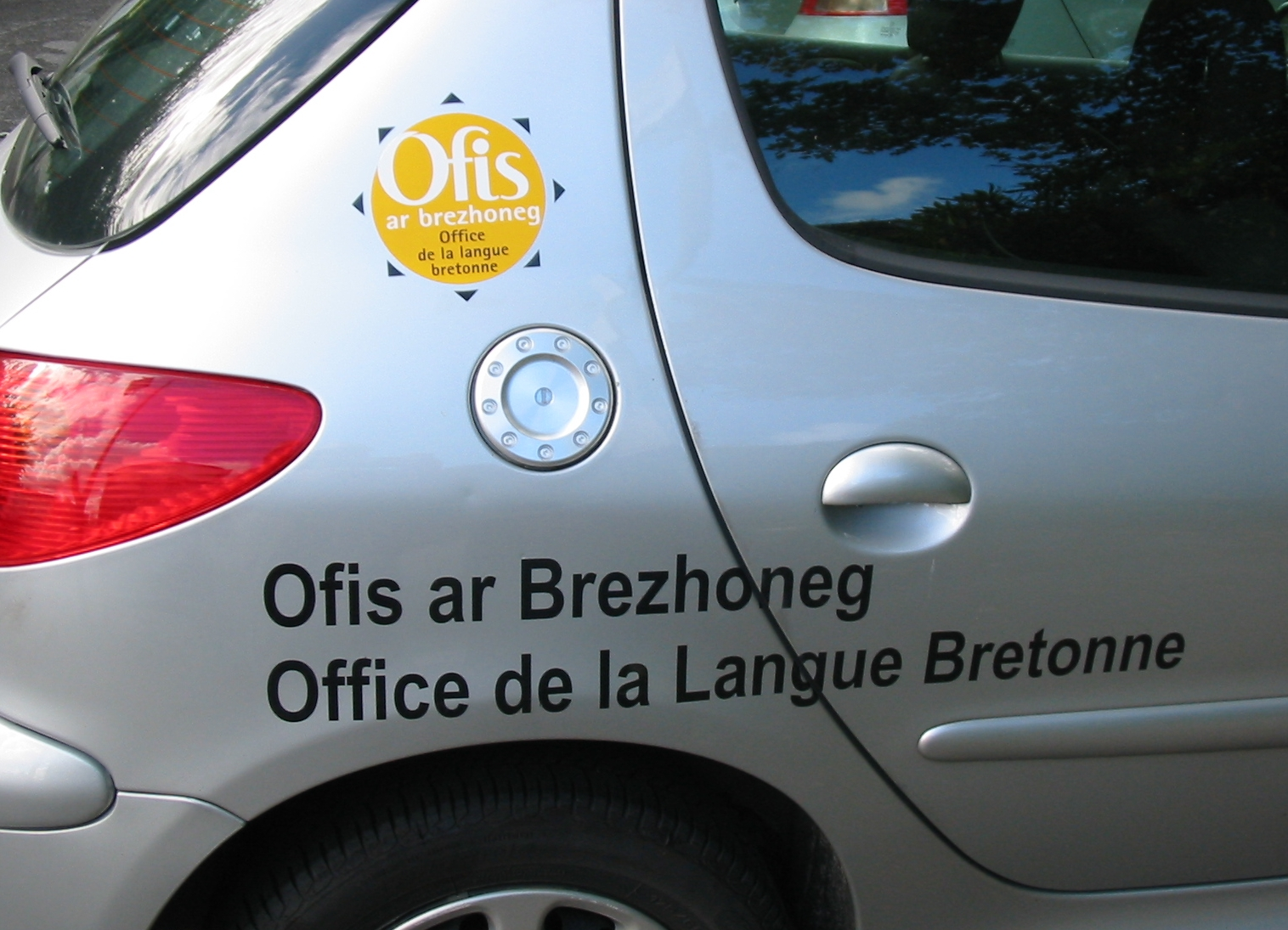
Ofis Publik ar Brezhoneg, the Breton language agency, was set up in 1999 by the Brittany region to promote and develop the use of Breton.

=== Nation ===
French is the sole official language of France. Supporters of Breton and other minority languages continue to argue for their recognition and for their place in education, public schools, and public life.

==== Constitution ====
In July 2008, the legislature amended the French Constitution, adding article 75-1: les langues régionales appartiennent au patrimoine de la France (the regional languages belong to the heritage of France).

The European Charter for Regional or Minority Languages, which obliges signatory states to recognize minority and regional languages, was signed by France in 1999 but has not been ratified. On 27 October 2015, the Senate rejected a draft constitutional law ratifying the charter.

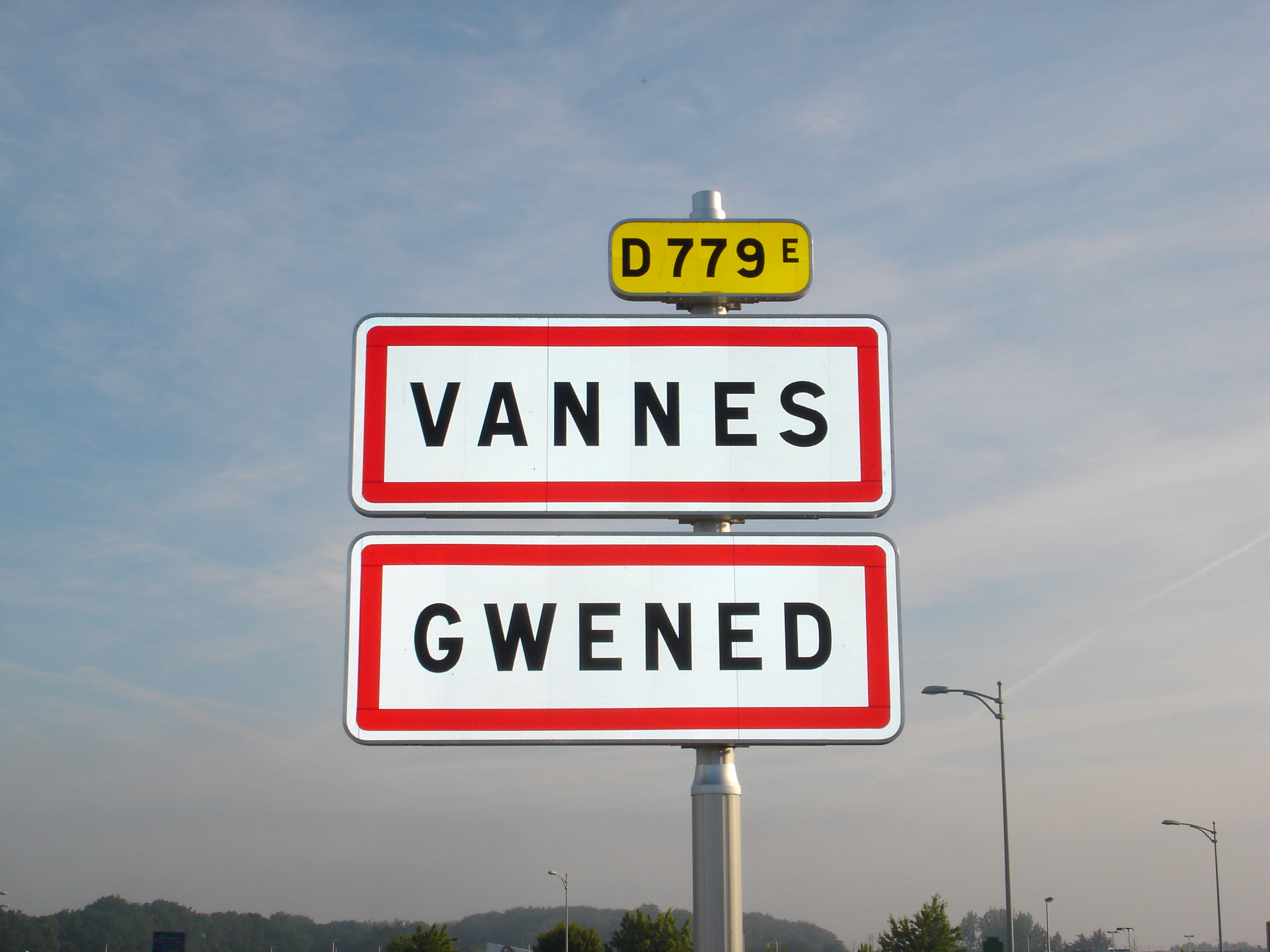
Bilingual sign in Gwened/Vannes

=== Region ===
Regional and departmental authorities use Breton to a very limited extent. Some bilingual signage has also been installed such as street name signs in Breton towns.

Under the Toubon Law, it is illegal for commercial signage to be in Breton alone. Signs must be bilingual or only in French. Since commercial signage usually has limited physical space, most businesses have signs only in French.

Ofis Publik ar Brezhoneg, the Breton-language agency, was set up in 1999 by the Brittany region to promote and develop the daily use of Breton. It helped to create the Ya d'ar brezhoneg campaign, to encourage enterprises, organisations and communes to promote the use of Breton, for example by installing bilingual signage or translating their websites into Breton.

== Education ==
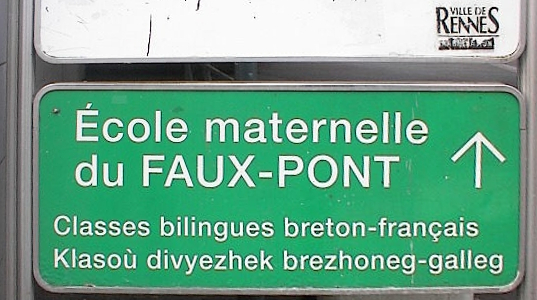
Sign in French and partly in Breton in Rennes, outside a school with bilingual classes

In the late 20th century, the French government considered incorporating the independent Breton-language immersion schools (called Diwan) into the state education system. This action was blocked by the French Constitutional Council based on the 1994 amendment to the Constitution that establishes French as the language of the republic. Therefore, no other language may be used as a language of instruction in state schools. The Toubon Law implemented the amendment, asserting that French is the language of public education.

The Diwan schools were founded in Brittany in 1977 to teach Breton by immersion. Since their establishment, Diwan schools have provided fully immersive primary school and partially immersive secondary school instruction in Breton for thousands of students across Brittany. This has directly contributed to the growing numbers of school-age speakers of Breton. The schools have also gained fame from their high level of results in school exams, including those on French language and literature. Breton-language schools do not receive funding from the national government, though the Brittany Region may fund them.

Another teaching method is a bilingual approach by Div Yezh ("Two Languages") in the State schools, created in 1979. Dihun ("Awakening") was created in 1990 for bilingual education in the Catholic schools.

=== Statistics ===
In 2018, 18,337 pupils (about 2% of all students in Brittany) attended Diwan, Div Yezh and Dihun schools, and their number has increased yearly. This was short of the goal of Jean-Yves Le Drian, the president of the Regional Council, who aimed to have 20,000 students in bilingual schools by 2010 and "their recognition" for "their place in education, public schools, and public life"; nevertheless, he described being encouraged by the growth of the movement.

In 2007, some 4,500 to 5,000 adults followed an evening or correspondence one Breton-language course. The transmission of Breton in 1999 was estimated to be 3 percent.

Growth of the percentage of pupils in bilingual education
| Year | Number | Percentage of all pupils in Brittany |
|---|---|---|
| 2005 | 10,397 | 1.24% |
| 2006 | 11,092 | 1.30% |
| 2007 | 11,732 | 1.38% |
| 2008 | 12,333 | 1.4% |
| 2009 | 13,077 | 1.45% |
| 2010 | 13,493 | 1.48% |
| 2011 | 14,174 | 1.55% |
| 2012 | 14,709 | 1.63% |
| 2013 | 15,338 | 1.70% |
| 2014 | 15,840 | 1.73% |
| 2015 | 16,345 | 1.78% |
| 2016 | 17,024 | 1.86% |
| 2017 | 17,748 | 1.93% |
| 2018 | 18,337 | 2.00% |
| 2019 | 18,890 | 2.00% |
| 2020 | 19,165 | 2.00% |
| 2021 | 19,336 | 2.2% |
| 2022 | 19,765 | 2.3% |
| 2024 | 20,280 | 2.5% |
| 2025 | 19,978 | |

Percentage of pupils in bilingual education per department
| Department | Primary education (2022) |
|---|---|
| Finistère | 9.0% |
| Morbihan | 6.7% |
| Côtes-d'Armor | 4.4% |
| Ille-et-Vilaine | 1.8% |
| Loire-Atlantique | 0.5% |

=== Municipalities ===
The 10 communes with the highest percentage of pupils in bilingual primary education, listed with their total population
| Commune | Percentage (2023) | Population (2007) |
|---|---|---|
| Sant-Riwal (Finistère) | 100% | 177 |
| Bulad-Pestivien (Côtes-d'Armor) | 100% | 412 |
| Larruen (Côtes-d'Armor) | 100% | 457 |
| Plounevez-Moedeg (Côtes-d'Armor) | 68.2% | 1,467 |
| Langoned (Morbihan) | 43.6% | 1,771 |
| Kawan (Côtes-d'Armor) | 42.9% | 1,528 |
| Kommanna (Finistère) | 42.1% | 995 |
| Mêl-Karaez (Côtes-d'Armor) | 40.9% | 1,463 |
| Pleuzal / Runan (Côtes-d'Armor) | 39.4% | 1,466 |
| Mêlrant (Morbihan) | 38.8% | 1,519 |

The 10 communes of historic Brittany with the highest total population, listed with their percentages of pupils in bilingual primary education These figures include some cities in the department of Loire-Atlantique, which is now included in the Pays de la Loire region. See for example Brittany (administrative region).
| Commune | Percentage (2008) | Population (2007) |
|---|---|---|
| Naoned (Loire-Atlantique) | 1.4% | 290,943 |
| Roazhon (Ille-et-Vilaine) | 2.87% | 213,096 |
| Brest (Finistère) | 1.94% | 146,519 |
| Sant-Nazer (Loire-Atlantique) | 0.41% | 71,046 |
| Kemper (Finistère) | 3.17% | 67,255 |
| An Oriant (Morbihan) | 2.71% | 59,805 |
| Gwened (Morbihan) | 7.71% | 55,383 |
| Sant-Maloù (Ille-et-Vilaine) | 0.55% | 50,206 |
| Sant-Brieg (Côtes-d'Armor) | 3.98% | 48,178 |
| Sant-Ervlan (Loire-Atlantique) | ? | 44,364 |

=== Other forms of education ===
In addition to bilingual education (including Breton-medium education), the region has introduced the Breton language in primary education, mainly in the department of Finistère. The "initiation" sessions are generally one to three hours per week and consist of songs and games.

Schools in secondary education (collèges and lycées) offer some courses in Breton. In 2010, nearly 5,000 students in Brittany were reported to be taking this option. Additionally, the University of Rennes 2 has a Breton-language department, which offers courses in the language, along with a master's degree in Breton and Celtic Studies.

== Phonology ==
=== Vowels ===
| | | Front | | Back |
| | | unr. | rnd. | Back |
|---|---|---|---|---|
| Close | short | i | y | u |
| Close | long | iː | yː | uː |
| Close-mid | | eː | øː | oː |
| Open-mid | | ɛ | œ | ɔ |
| Open | | a | | ɑː |

Vowels in Breton may be short or long. All unstressed vowels are short; stressed vowels can be short or long. (Vowel length is not noted in usual orthographies, as it is implicit in the phonology of particular dialects, and not all dialects pronounce stressed vowels as long. The vowels: ⟨eu, o, e, a⟩, are pronounced when they are long: /ø, o, e, ɑ/, when they are short: /œ, ɔ, ɛ, æ, a/ and between (especially when they are short): /œ̝, o̞, e̞, ä/.

The phoneme ⟨eu⟩ (/ø, œ, œ̝/) tending to be replaced by ⟨e⟩ so /e, ɛ, e̞/ in fast speech.

An emergence of a schwa sound occurs as a result of vowel neutralization in post-tonic position in different dialects.

The nasal vowels /ã, õ, ẽ, ĩ, ỹ/ exist in Breton; there are also nasal diphthongs /ãõ, ẽõ/. When it's possible written: ⟨ã, õ, ẽ, ĩ, ũ⟩ like in Portuguese, but it's most commonly noted by non-ambiguously appending an ⟨ñ⟩ letter after the base vowel (this depends on the orthographic variant). But it's not always phonemic, and it's never phonemic before an ⟨n⟩.

=== Diphthongs ===
| | Falling | Rising |
|---|---|---|
| a | ai | ea |
| e | ei | ae |
| o | | ao eo |

Note that, depending on the dialect, ⟨i⟩ can be pronounced /i/ or /j/, ⟨ou⟩ and ⟨o⟩ can be pronounced /u/ for ⟨ou⟩ and /o/ for ⟨o⟩, respectively, and both can be pronounced /w/.

=== Consonants ===
| | | Labial | Dental | Alveolar | Palatal (-alveolar) | Velar | | Uvular/ Pharyngeal | Glottal |
| | | Labial | Dental | Alveolar | Palatal (-alveolar) | plain | labial | Uvular/ Pharyngeal | Glottal |
|---|---|---|---|---|---|---|---|---|---|
| Nasal | | m | | n | ɲ | (ŋ) | | | |
| Plosive/ Affricate | voiceless | p | | t | (tʃ)* | k | kʷ | | |
| Plosive/ Affricate | voiced | b | | d | (dʒ)* | g | gʷ | | |
| Fricative | voiceless | f ~ ɸ | | s̻ | ʃ | x | | (ħ)* | h |
| Fricative | voiced | v | (ð)* | z̻ | ʒ | ɣ | | (ʁ) | |
| Approximant | median | | | (ɹ) | j (ɥ) | | w | | |
| Approximant | lateral | | | l | ʎ | | | | |
| Vibrant | voiced | | | r ~ ɾ | | | | | |
| Vibrant | voiceless | | | (r̥ ~ ɾ̥) | | | | | |

* Mainly in Gwenedeg.

Symbols in parentheses are only found as allophones or in loanwords.

- The pronunciation of the letter ⟨r⟩ now varies: [ʁ] is used in the French-influenced standard language, in central Cornouaillais and in some other central dialects co-existing with [r~ɾ], whereas [r~ɾ] is the common realisation in Léon and often in Haut-Vannetais. In the Grand-Trégor, [ɾ] or even [ɹ] may be found. [r̥~ɾ̥] is an allophone of [r~ɾ] in every dialect.
- The /ð/ is a conservative realisation of the lenition (or the "spirant mutation" in cases that the phenomenon originates from the mutation of /t~θ/, respectively) of /d/ and /t/ which is to be found in varieties of Gwenedeg and in Cornouaillais dialects of Île de Sein and part of Belle-Île. The Peurunvan, for instance, uses ⟨z⟩ for both mutations, which are regularly and more prominently pronounced [z] in the other dialects. In traditional literature written in the Gwenedeg dialect, two different graphemes are used to represent the dental fricative depending on the scripture's historical period. ⟨d⟩ was used for the sound, but it is today replaced by the regular ⟨z⟩. The area this phenomenon has been found to be evident in Gwenedeg dialect encompasses the towns of Pontivy and Baud.
- The mutation of /p/ to ⟨f⟩ is to do with /ɸ/ in Old Breton and by some modern Breton speakers. It can also be an allophone of ⟨f⟩.
- [ʒ] is only present in loanwords or as an intervocalic allophone of /ʃ/.
- /ħ/ (written as ⟨c'h⟩) is present in varieties of Haut-Vannetais dialect and some part of eastern Cornouaille (e.g. the word for goat).
- [tʃ, dʒ] only appear in Gwenedeg when /k, g/ are followed by /e, i, u/ (or, in certain contexts, preceded by /i, u/). That is why Gwenedeg is colloquially nicknamed the “Breton tcheu-tcheu”.
- /ɲ, ʎ/ are in many dialects realized as [n, j] respectively.
- ⟨p, t, k⟩ are most of the time like in Welsh aspirated as [pʰ, tʰ, kʰ] especiely in slow speech.
- ⟨s, z⟩ are pronounced as laminal [s̻, z̻].

== Orthography ==
The first extant Breton texts, contained in the Leyden manuscript, were written at the end of the 8th century, 50 years prior to the Strasbourg Oaths, which are considered to be the earliest example of French. Like many medieval orthographies, Old and Middle Breton had an orthography that was at first not standardised, and the spelling of a particular word varied at the author's discretion. In 1499, however, the Catholicon, was published; as the first dictionary written for both French and Breton, it became a point of reference on how to transcribe the language. The orthography presented in the Catholicon was largely similar to that of French, in particular with respect to the representation of vowels, as well as the use of both the Latinate digraph ⟨qu⟩, which was a remnant of the sound change /kʷ/ > /k/ in Latin, and the Brittonic ⟨cou-⟩ or ⟨cu-⟩ to represent /k/ before front vowels.

As phonetic and phonological differences between the dialects began to magnify, many regions, particularly the Vannes country, began to devise their own orthographies. Many of those orthographies were more closely related to the French model albeit with some modifications. Examples of modifications include the replacement of Old Breton -⟨z⟩ with -⟨h⟩ to denote word-final /x~h/ (an evolution of Old Breton /θ/ in the Vannes dialect) and the use of -⟨h⟩ to denote the initial mutation of /k/ (today, this mutation is written ⟨c'h⟩).

In the 1830s, Jean-François Le Gonidec created a modern phonetic system for the language.

During the early 20th century, a group of writers known as Emglev ar Skrivanerien elaborated and reformed Le Gonidec's system. They made it more suitable as a super-dialectal representation of the dialects of Cornouaille, Leon and Trégor (known as from Kernev, Leon and Treger in Breton). This KLT orthography was established in 1911. At the same time, writers of the more divergent Vannetais dialect developed a phonetic system, which was also based on that of Le Gonidec.

Following proposals that had been made during the 1920s, the KLT and Vannetais orthographies were merged in 1941 to create an orthographic system to represent all four dialects. This Peurunvan ("wholly unified") orthography was significant for the inclusion of the digraph ⟨zh⟩, which represents a /h/ in Vannetais and corresponds to a /z/ in the KLT dialects.

In 1955, François Falc'hun and the group Emgleo Breiz proposed a new orthography, which was designed to use a set of graphemes closer to the conventions of French. This Orthographe universitaire ("University Orthography", known in Breton as Skolveurieg) was given official recognition by the French authorities as the "official orthography of Breton in French education". It was opposed in the region and was used only by the magazine Brud Nevez and the publishing house Emgleo Breiz, which disappeared in 2015.

In the 1970s, a new standard orthography was devised: the etrerannyezhel or interdialectale. This system is based on the derivation of the words.

Today, most writers continue to use the Peurunvan orthography, and it is the version taught in most Breton-language schools.

=== Alphabet ===
Breton is written in the Latin script. Peurunvan, the most commonly used orthography, consists of the following letters:

a, b, ch, c'h, d, e, f, g, h, i, j, k, l, m, n, o, p, r, s, t, u, v, w, y, z

The circumflex, grave accent, trema and tilde appear on some letters. The diacritics are used in the following way:

â, ê, î, ô, û, ù, ü, ñ

=== Differences between Skolveurieg and Peurunvan ===
Both orthographies use the above alphabet although ⟨é⟩ is used only in Skolveurieg.

Differences between the two systems are particularly noticeable in word endings. In Peurunvan, final obstruents, which are devoiced in absolute final position and voiced in sandhi before voiced sounds, are represented by a grapheme that indicates a voiceless sound. In OU they are written as voiced but represented as voiceless before suffixes: braz "big", brasoc'h "bigger".

In addition, Peurunvan maintains the KLT convention, which distinguishes noun/adjective pairs by nouns written with a final voiced consonant and adjectives with a voiceless one. No distinction is made in pronunciation. e.g., brezhoneg 'Breton language' vs. brezhonek 'Breton (adj)'.

Comparison of different orthographies
| Etrerannyezhel (1975) | Peurunvan (1941) | Skolveurieg (1956) | English gloss |
|---|---|---|---|
| glaw | glav | glao | rain |
| piw | piv | piou | who |
| levr | levr | leor | book |
| ewid | evit | evid | for |
| gant | gant | gand | with |
| anezhi | anezhi | anezi | of her |
| ouzhpenn | ouzhpenn | ouspenn | add |
| brawañ | bravañ | brava | most beautiful |
| pelec'h | pelec'h | peleh | where |

=== Pronunciation of the Breton alphabet ===
C (as a single letter), Q and X appear mainly in loanwords. The digraph ⟨zh⟩ represents a variable sound that may exhibit as /s/, /z/, or /h/, and descends from a now-extinct sound /θ/, which is still extant in Welsh as ⟨th⟩.

| Letter | Kerneveg | Leoneg | Tregiereg | Gwenedeg |
|---|---|---|---|---|
| A a | [ä, a, æ, ɑː] | | | |
| â | [ɑː] | | | |
| ae | [ae̯~aj] | [ɛa] | [ɛː] | |
| an | [ɑ̃n~ɑn] | | | |
| añ | [ɑ̃~ɑ] | | | |
| ao | [ao̯~aw~ɔː] | | [ɔː] | [ao̯~aw] |
| aou | [ɔʊ̯~ɔw] | | | |
| B b | [b], [p] | | | |
| Ch ch | [ʃ], [ʒ] | | | |
| C'h c'h | [h], [ɣ], [x] | [h], [ɣ~ɦ], [x] | [h], [x] | [ħ, h, x] |
| c'hw | [xw~hw] | [xw] | | [hw~(hɥ)] |
| D d | [d], [d̪],[t] | | | [d~d̪], [ð] |
| E e | [æ, ɛ, e̞, e, eː] | | [æ, ɛ, e̞, e, eː], [ə] | |
| ê | [ɛː] | | | |
| ei | [ɛi̯~ɛj] | | | |
| eeu | [eø̯~ew] | | | |
| eo | [eː~eo̞] | [eɔ] | [eː] | [eː, ə] |
| eu | [œ, œ̝, ø, øː, ɛ, e] | | | |
| eü | [ɛɥ, e(v)y] | | | |
| eue | [ø̯e~ɥe] | | | |
| F f | [f~ɸ], [v] | | | |
| 'f | [v~ɸ] | | | |
| G g | [ɡ~ɣ], [k] | [ɡ], [k] | | [ɡ~(ɟ)][k~(c)] |
| gn | [ɲ] | | | |
| gw | [ɡw] | | | [ɡw~(ɟɥ)] |
| H h | [h] | | | |
| I i | [i, iː, j] | | | |
| lh | [ʎ], [j] | | | |
| J j | [ʒ], [ʃ] | | | |
| K k | [k] | | | [k~(c)] |
| L l | [l], [ɬ] | | | |
| M m | [m] | | | |
| N n | [n], [ŋ] | | | |
| ñ | [◌̃~Ø] | | | |
| ñv | [◌̃w~Øw, ◌̃o̞~Øo̞] | [◌̃w~Øw] | | |
| O o | [ɔ, o̞, o, oː] | | | |
| oa | [ɔ̯a~wa, ɔ̯ɑː~wɑː] | [ɔ̯a~wa, ɔ̯ɑː~wɑː, ɔa, oːa] | [ɔ̯a~wa, ɔ̯ɑː~wɑː] | [ɔ̯ɛ~wɛ, ɔ̯eː~weː] |
| ôa | [oːa] | | | |
| oe | [ɔ̯ɛ(ː)~wɛ(ː)] | | | |
| on | [ɔ̃n~ɔn] | | | |
| oñ | [ɔ̃~ɔ] | | | |
| ou | [u, uː, w] | | | [u, uː, w~(ɥ)] |
| où | [u] | | [o] | [ø, ow, aw, aɥ, ɔɥ] |
| oü | [oy̆, oːy] | | | |
| P p | [p] | | | |
| R r | [ʀ~ʁ~r~ɾ], [χ~r̥~ɾ̥] | | [ʀ~ʁ~r~ɾ~ɹ], [χ~r̥~ɾ̥~ɹ̥] | [ʀ~ʁ~r~ɾ], [χ~r̥~ɾ̥] |
| S s | [s̻, z̻] | | | |
| sh | [s̻] | | | [h] |
| sk | [s̻k~s̻] | [s̻k] | | [s̻k~(s̻c~ʃc)] |
| st | [s̻t] | | | [ʃt] |
| T t | [t], [t̪] | [t] | | |
| U u | [y, yː, ɥ] | | | |
| ui | [ɥi, ɥiː] | | | |
| ul, un, ur | [ɔl, ɔn, ɔr, ɔʀ] | [œl, œn, œr] | [œl, œn, œɾ] | [yl, yn, yr] |
| V v | [v],[o̞~o] | | | |
| vh | [f] | | | |
| W w | [w] | | | [w~(ɥ)] |
| Y y | [j] | | | |
| Z z | [z̻], Ø, [s̻] | [z̻, ʒ/ʃ] | [z̻], Ø | [z̻], Ø, [ð̞] |
| zh | [z̻], [s̻] | | | [h] |

Notes:

1. Vocative particle: â Vreizh "O Brittany".
2. Word-initially.
3. Word-finally.
4. Unwritten lenition of ⟨ch, c'h, f, s⟩ and spirantization of ⟨p⟩ > ⟨f⟩ [v].
5. Unstressed ⟨e, eu, o⟩ represent [ɛ, œ, ɔ] in Leoneg but [e, ø, o] in the other dialects. The realisations [ɛ̞, œ̞, ɔ̞] appear mainly before ⟨rr⟩ (also less often before ⟨c'h⟩), semivowels [j, w], consonant clusters beginning with ⟨r⟩ or ⟨l⟩. Stressed long ⟨e, eu, o⟩ represent [eː, øː, oː].
6. In Gwenedeg velars are palatalized before ⟨e⟩ and ⟨i⟩, i.e. ⟨k⟩, ⟨g⟩, ⟨kw/kou⟩, ⟨c'hw/c'hou⟩, ⟨gw/gou⟩, ⟨w/ou⟩, ⟨sk⟩ represent [c~tʃ, ɟ~dʒ, cɥ, hɥ, ɟɥ, ɥ, sc~ʃc]. In the case of word-final ⟨g⟩ and ⟨k⟩ palatalization to [c] also occurs after ⟨i⟩.
7. Before a vowel other than ⟨i⟩ the digraph ⟨ni⟩ is written instead of ⟨gn⟩, e.g. bleniañ "to drive", radical blegn, 1PS preterite blegnis, 3PS preterite blenias.
8. Silent in words such as ha(g), he(c'h), ho(c'h), holl, hon, hor and hol. Always silent in Gwenedeg and Leoneg.
9. ⟨i⟩ is realized as [j] when it precedes or follows a vowel (or when between vowels), but in words such as lien, liorzh, rakdiazezañ it represents [iː] (in orthography ⟨ï⟩ may be used: lïen, lïorzh, rakdïazezañ).
10. ⟨ilh⟩ represents [ʎ] when it follows a vowel, after a consonant it represents [iʎ]. But before a vowel other than ⟨i⟩, ⟨li⟩ is written instead of ⟨ilh⟩, e.g. heuliañ "to follow", radical heuilh, 1PS preterite heuilhis, 3PS preterite heulias. In some regions [j] may be heard instead of [ʎ].
11. Word-finally after a cluster of unvoiced consonants.
12. In front of ⟨k, g⟩.
13. The digraph ⟨ou⟩ is realized like ⟨w⟩ when preceded or followed by a vowel (or when between vowels), but in words such as Doue, douar, gouarn it represents [uː].
14. The digraph ⟨où⟩ represents plural endings. Its pronunciation varies by dialect: [u, o, ø, ow, aw, aɥ, ɔɥ] rating geographically from Northwest Leon to Southeast Gwened.
15. ⟨v⟩ usually represents [v], but word-finally (except in word-final ⟨ñv⟩) it represents [w] in KLT, [ɥ] in Gwenedeg and [f] in Goëlo. The pronunciation [v] is retained word-finally in verbs. In words bliv, Gwiskriv, gwiv, liv, piv, riv it represents [u] in KLT, [ɥ] in Gwenedeg and [f] in Goëlo. Word-finally following ⟨r, l, n, z⟩ it represents [o].
16. But silent in words such as gouez, bloaz, goaz, ruziañ, kleiz, rakdïazezañ, bezañ, Roazhon, dezhañ, kouezhañ, 'z, az, ez, da'z, gwirionez, enep(g)wirionez, moneiz, falsvoneiz, karantez, kengarantez, nevez, nevezc'hanet, nadozioù, abardaez, gwez, bemdez, kriz, bleiz, morvleiz, dezhi. ⟨z⟩ is generally silent in Kerneweg, Tregerieg and Gwenedeg, but in Leoneg ⟨z(h)⟩ is always pronounced.
17. Used to distinguish words such as stêr "river", hêr "heir", kêr "town" (also written kaer) from ster "sense", her "bold", ker "dear".
18. Used to distinguish trôad "circuit/tour" from troad "foot".
19. In northern dialects (mainly in Leoneg), there is a tendency to voice ⟨c'h⟩ between vowels. [ɣ] also appears as the lenition of ⟨g, c'h⟩ and mixed mutation of ⟨g⟩.
20. The lenition of ⟨d⟩ and the spirantization of ⟨t⟩ are both represented by ⟨z⟩ is mainly pronounced [z] although in certain regions [s] (especially for the spirantization of ⟨t⟩ in Cornouaille) and [ð] (in some Haut-Vannetais varieties)^{31} also occur.
21. The pronunciation of ⟨r⟩ varies by dialect, nowadays uvular [ʀ] (or [ʁ]) is standard; [r] occurs in Leoneg, [ɾ] or [ɹ] in Tregerieg, and [ʀ], [ʁ], [r], and [ɾ] in Gwenedeg.
22. In Gwenedeg an unstressed ⟨e⟩ often represents [ə].
23. Lenited varieties of ⟨r, l, n⟩ may appear word-initially in case of soft mutation.
24. In Leoneg [u(ː)] in front of a nasal.
25. In Leoneg ⟨w⟩ represents [v] before ⟨e, i⟩.
26. In Leoneg ⟨z(h)⟩ represents [ʃ] or [ʒ] before ⟨i⟩.
27. In Leoneg ⟨gwr⟩ represents [ɡr].
28. Before a vowel.
29. Forms of the indefinite article.
30. A conservative realisation of the initial mutation of ⟨d⟩ and ⟨t⟩, used in certain parts of the Vannes country.

== Grammar ==
=== Nouns ===
Breton nouns are marked for gender and number. While Breton has a fairly typical gender system for Western Europe, Breton has number markers that demonstrate rarer behaviors.

==== Gender ====
Breton has two genders: masculine (gourel) and feminine (gwregel). It has largely lost its historic neuter (nepreizh), as has also occurred in the other Celtic languages and in the Romance languages. Certain suffixes (-ach/-aj, -(a)dur, -er, -lec'h, -our, -ti, -va) are masculine, while others (-enti, -er, -ez, -ezh, -ezon, -i, -eg, -ell, and the singulative -enn) are feminine. The suffix -eg can be masculine or feminine.

There are certain non-determinant factors that influence gender assignment. Biological sex is applied for animate referents. Metals, time divisions (except for eur "hour", noz "night" and sizhun "week") and mountains tend to be masculine, while rivers, cities and countries tend to be feminine.

However, gender assignment to certain words often varies between dialects.

==== Number ====
Number in Breton is primarily based on an opposition between singular and plural. However, the system is full of complexities in how the distinction is realized.

Although modern Breton has lost the dual number as a productive grammatical category, remnants of its use are preserved in certain nouns referring to paired body parts such as for eyes, ears, cheeks, legs, armpits, arms, hands, knees, thighs and wings. Those forms typically feature a prefix (daou-, di- or div-), which is etymologically derived from the numeral two. The dual number is no longer a productive feature of Breton grammar and survives only in a lexicalized form. Certain words such as daoulagad ('eyes') and divskouarn ('ears') are historically dual in origin. These forms can nevertheless undergo pluralization once more to yield daoulagadoù ('pairs of eyes') and diskouarnoù ('pairs of ears').

Like other Brythonic languages, Breton has a singulative suffix, which forms singulars out of collective nouns for which the morphologically less complex form is the plural. Thus, the singulative of the collective logod "mice" is logodenn "mouse". "Breton exhibits a more complex system than Welsh in this respect. Collective nouns can undergo pluralization, yielding forms with meanings distinct from the base collective. For example, pesk ('fish', singular) forms the collective plural pesked ('fish'), which may then be singulativized as peskedenn to denote an individual fish from a group. This singulative of the plural can in turn be pluralized once more, producing peskedennoù ('fishes')."

"In addition, the Breton plural system is complicated by the existence of two distinct pluralizing functions. Alongside the 'default' plural, there is a second formation used to convey a sense of variety or diversity. As a result, a single noun may yield two semantically different plurals; for example, park ('park') forms parkoù ('parks') and parkeier ('various different parks')." Ball reports that the latter pluralizer is used only for inanimate nouns. Certain formations have been lexicalized to have meanings other than that which might be predicted solely from the morphology: dour "water" pluralized forms dourioù which means not "waters" but instead "rivers", while doureier now has come to mean "running waters after a storm". Certain forms have lost the singular from their paradigm: keloù means "news" and *kel is not used, while keleier has become the regular plural, 'different news items'.

Meanwhile, certain nouns can form doubly marked plurals with lexicalized meanings – bugel "child" is pluralized once into bugale "children" and then pluralized a second time to make bugaleoù "groups of children".

The diminutive suffix -ig also has the somewhat unusual property of triggering double marking of the plural: bugelig means "little child", but the doubly pluralized bugaleigoù means "little children"; bag boat has a singular diminutive bagig and a simple plural bagoù, thus its diminutive plural is the doubly pluralized bagoùigoù.

As seen elsewhere in many Celtic languages, the formation of the plural can be difficult to predict, being determined by a mix of semantic, morphological and lexical factors.

The most common plural marker is -où, with its variant -ioù; most nouns that use that marker are inanimates, but collectives of both inanimate and animate nouns always use it as well.

Most animate nouns, including trees, have a plural in -ed. However, in some dialects the use of this affix has become rare. Various masculine nouns including occupations, as well as the word Saoz ("Englishman", plural Saozon), take the suffix -ien, with a range of variants including -on, -ion, -an and -ian.

The rare pluralizing suffixes -er/-ier and -i are used for a few nouns. When they are appended, they also trigger a change in the vowel of the root: -i triggers a vowel harmony effect in which some or all preceding vowels are changed to i (kenderv "cousin" → kindirvi "cousins"; bran "crow" → brini "crows"; klujur "partridge" → klujiri "partridges"); the changes associated with -er/-ier are less predictable.

Various nouns instead form their plural merely with ablaut: a or o in the stem is changed to e: askell "wing" → eskell "wings"; dant "tooth" → dent "teeth"; kordenn "rope" → kerdenn "ropes".

Another set of nouns have lexicalized plurals that bear little if any resemblance to their singulars. These include plac'h "girl" → merc'hed, porc'hell "pig" → moc'h, buoc'h "cow" → saout, and ki "dog" → chas.

In compound nouns, the head noun, which usually comes first, is pluralized.

=== Verbal aspect ===
Like in other Celtic languages, as well as in English, a variety of verbal constructions can be used to express grammatical aspect such as to show a distinction between progressive and habitual actions:

| Breton | Cornish | Irish | English |
|---|---|---|---|
| Me zo o komz gant ma amezeg | Yth eso'vy ow kewsel orth ow hentrevek | Táim ag labhairt le mo chomharsa | I am talking to my neighbour |
| Me a gomz gant ma amezeg (bep mintin) | My a gews orth ow hentrevek (pub myttin) | Labhraím le mo chomharsa (gach maidin) | I talk to my neighbour (every morning) |

=== Inflected prepositions ===
As in other modern Celtic languages, Breton pronouns are fused into preceding prepositions to produce a sort of inflected preposition. Here are some examples in Breton, Cornish, Welsh, Irish, Scottish Gaelic, and Manx, along with English translations:

| Breton | Cornish | Welsh | Irish | Scottish Gaelic | Manx | English |
|---|---|---|---|---|---|---|
| ul levr zo ganin a book is with-me | yma lyver genev | mae llyfr gennyf | tá leabhar agam | tha leabhar agam | ta lioar aym | I have a book |
| un died zo ganit a drink is with-you.SG | yma diwes genes | mae diod gennyt | tá deoch agat | tha deoch agad | ta jough ayd | you have a drink |
| un urzhiataer zo gantañ a computer is with-him | yma jynn-amontya ganso | mae cyfrifiadur ganddo | tá ríomhaire aige | tha coimpiutair aige | ta co-earrooder echey | he has a computer |
| ur bugel zo ganti a child is with-her | yma flogh gensi | mae plentyn ganddi | tá leanbh aici | tha leanabh aice | ta lhiannoo eck | she has a child |
| ur c'harr zo ganimp a car is with-us | yma karr genen | mae car gennym | tá gluaisteán / carr againn | tha càr againn | ta gleashtan / carr ain | we have a car |
| un ti zo ganeoc'h a house is with-you.PL | yma chi genowgh | mae tŷ gennych | tá teach agaibh | tha taigh agaibh | ta thie eu | you have a house |
| arc'hant zo ganto money is with-them | yma mona gansa | mae arian ganddynt | tá airgead acu | tha airgead aca | ta argid oc | they have money |

In the examples above, the Goidelic languages (Irish, Scottish Gaelic, and Manx) use the preposition meaning at to show possession, and the Brittonic languages use the one meaning with. The Goidelic languages, however, use the preposition with to express "belong to" (Irish is liom an leabhar, Scottish is leam an leabhar, Manx s'lhiams yn lioar, The book belongs to me).

The Welsh examples are in literary Welsh. The order and the preposition may differ slightly in Colloquial Welsh (Formal mae car gennym, North Wales mae gynnon ni gar, South Wales mae car gyda ni).

=== Initial consonant mutations ===
Breton has four initial consonant mutations. Modern Breton has lost the nasal mutation of Welsh (except for rare words such the word "door": "dor" "an nor"). However it has a "hard" mutation (also present in Cornish but not in Welsh), in which voiced stops become voiceless; it also has a "mixed" mutation, which is a mixture of hard and soft mutations.

Initial consonant mutations in Breton
| Unmutated consonant | Mutations | | | |
| Unmutated consonant | Hard | Mixed | Soft | Aspirant |
|---|---|---|---|---|
| m [m] | | v [v] | v [v] | |
| b [b] | p [p̎] | v [v] | v [v] | |
| p [p] | | | b [b̥] | f [v̥] |
| g [ɡ] | k [k͈] | c'h [ɣ] | c'h [ɣ] | |
| k [k] | | | g [ɡ̊] | c'h [x] |
| d [d] | t [t͈] | t [t͈] | z [z]/d [ð] | |
| t [t] | | | d [d̥] | z [h] |
| gw [ɡʷ] | kw [kʷ] | w [w] | w [w] | |

=== Word order ===
Normal word order, like the other Insular Celtic languages, is at its core VSO (verb-subject-object), which is most apparent in embedded clauses. However, Breton finite verbs in main clauses are additionally subject to V2 word order in which the finite main clause verb is typically the second element in the sentence. In fact, starting a sentence with a finite verb is generally ungrammatical in Breton.

Noun phrases, adverbial phrases, verbal nouns and the negative particle ne may stand in sentence-initial position to satisfy the V2 requirement. That makes it perfectly possible to put the subject or the object at the beginning of the sentence, largely depending on the focus of the speaker. The following options are possible (all with a little difference in meaning):

- the first places the verbal infinitive in initial position (as in (1)), followed by the auxiliary ober 'to do'.
- the second places the auxiliary verb bezañ 'to be' in initial position (as in (2)), followed by the subject and the construction o(c'h) + infinitive. At the end comes the object. This construction is an exception to verb-second.
- the third places the construction o(c'h) + infinitive in the initial position (as in (3)), followed by the auxiliary verb bezañ, the subject and the object.
- the fourth option places the object in initial position (as in (4)), followed by an inflected verb and then by the subject.
- the fifth, and originally least common, places the subject in initial position (as in (5)), followed by an inflected verb, followed by the object, just like in English (SVO).

Lenn a ra brezhoneg
read PRT do.3SG Breton
'He/she reads Breton.'

Emañ Yann {o lenn} brezhoneg
be.3SG Yann reading Breton
'Yann is reading Breton.'

{O lenn} emañ Yann brezhoneg
reading be.3SG Yann Breton
'Yann is reading Breton.'

Mat eo an istor
good be.3SG the story
'The story is good.'

An istor zo mat
the story be.3SG good
'The story is good.'

== Vocabulary ==
Breton uses much more borrowed vocabulary than its relatives further north; by some estimates a full 40% of its core vocabulary consists of loanwords from French.

=== Words and phrases ===
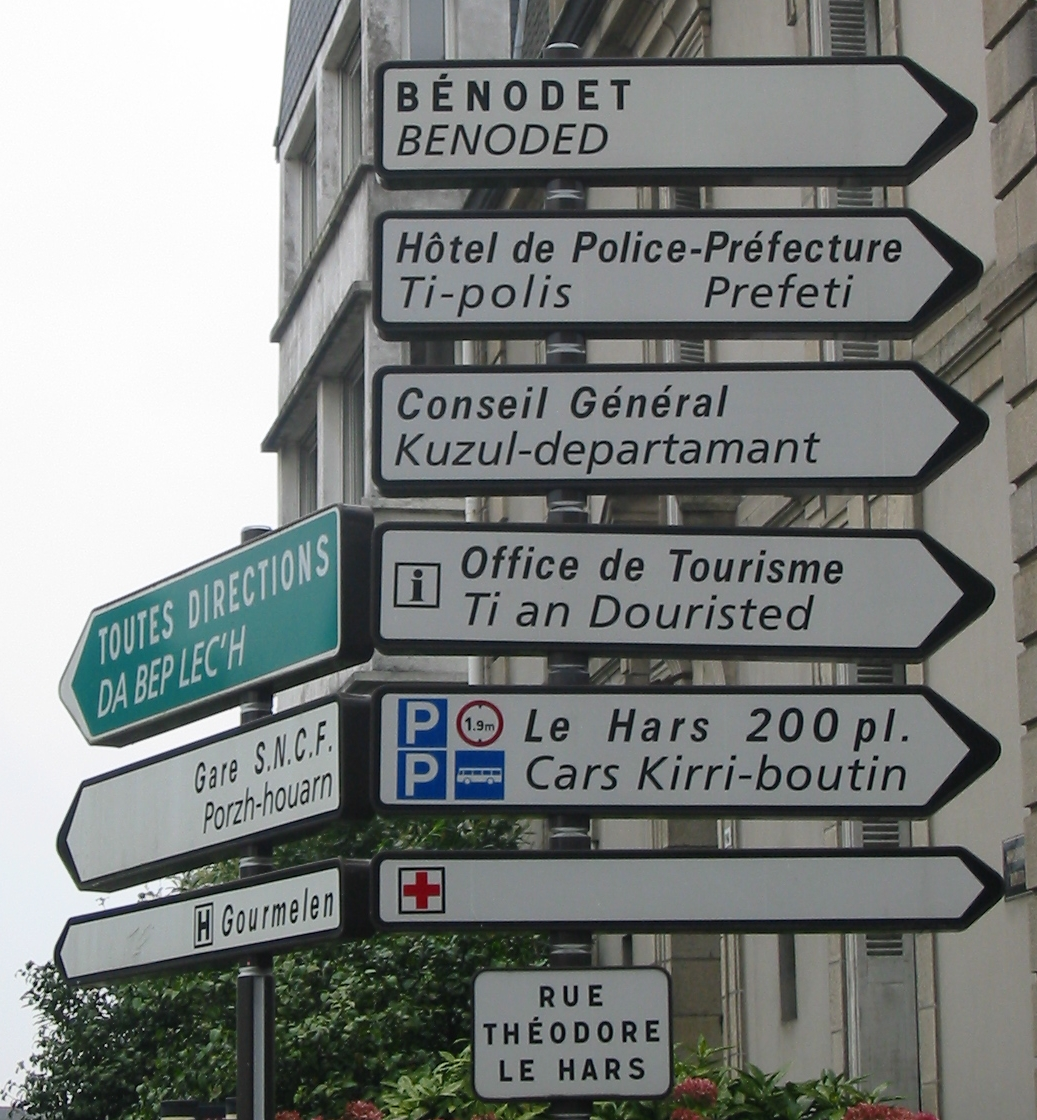
Bilingual signage in Quimper/Kemper. Note the use of the word ti in the Breton for 'police station' and 'tourist office', plus da bep lec'h for all directions.

Visitors to Brittany may encounter words and phrases (especially on signs and posters) such as the following:

| Breton | English |
|---|---|
| deuet mat | welcome |
| deuet mat oc'h | you're welcome |
| Breizh | Brittany |
| brezhoneg | Breton (language) |
| ti, ty | house |
| ti-kêr | town hall |
| kreiz-kêr | town centre |
| da bep lec'h | all directions |
| skol | school |
| skol-veur | university |
| bagad | pipe band (nearly) |
| fest-noz | lit. "night festival", a fest deiz or "day festival" also exists |
| kenavo | goodbye |
| krampouezh | pancakes (a pancake = ur grampouezhenn, see singulative) |
| sistr | cider |
| chouchenn | Breton mead |
| yec'hed mat | Cheers! |
| war vor atav | always at sea |
| kouign amann | rich butter and sugar cake |
| ya | yes |
| an dour | the water |
| mamm gozh | grandma |
| hent | road |

=== Borrowing from Breton by other languages ===
The English words dolmen and menhir have been borrowed from French, which took them from Breton. However, this is uncertain: for instance, menhir is peulvan or maen hir ("long stone"), maen sav ("straight stone") (two words: noun + adjective) in Breton. Dolmen is a misconstructed word (it should be taol-vaen). Some studies state that these words were borrowed from Cornish. Maen hir can be directly translated from Welsh as "long stone" (which is exactly what a menhir or maen hir is). The Cornish surnames Mennear, Minear and Manhire all derive from the Cornish men hyr ("long stone"), as does Tremenheere "settlement by the long stone".

The French word baragouiner ("to jabber in a foreign language or an unintelligible manner") is derived from Breton bara ("bread") and gwin ("wine"). The French word goéland ("large seagull") is derived from Breton gwelan, which shares the same root as English "gull" (Welsh gwylan, Cornish goelann).

== Sample texts ==
Article 1 of the Universal Declaration of Human Rights
| Breton: Dieub ha par en o dellezegezh hag o gwirioù eo ganet an holl dud. Poell ha skiant zo dezho ha dleout a reont bevañ an eil gant egile en ur spered a genvreudeuriezh. | English: All human beings are born free and equal in dignity and rights. They are endowed with reason and conscience and should act towards one another in a spirit of brotherhood. |

=== Lord's Prayer (Hon Tad) ===
On Tad hag a zo en neñv,
Hoc’h ano bezet santelleet,
Ho Rouantelez deuet deom,
Ho Polontez bezet greet
War an douar evel en neñv.
Roit deom hirio or bara pemdezieg;
Pardonit deom or pehejou,
Evel ma pardonom d’ar re o-deus manket ouzom;
Ha n’on lezit ket da goueza en tentadur,
Med on diwallit diouz an droug.

=== Ave Maria ===
Me ho salud, Mari, leun a c’hras,
An Aotrou Doue a zo ganeoc’h!
Benniget oc’h dreist an oll gwragez,
Ha benniget eo ar frouez euz ho korv, Jezuz.
Santez Mari, Mamm da Zoue,
Pedit evidom, peherien,
Bremañ ha da eur or maro. Amen!

== Language comparison ==
| English | French | Breton | Cornish | Welsh | Scottish Gaelic | Irish |
|---|---|---|---|---|---|---|
| earth | terre | douar | dor | daear | talamh | talamh |
| sky | ciel | oabl (older oabr) | ebron | wybren | speur | spéir |
| heaven | paradis | neñv | nev | nef | nèamh | neamh |
| food | nourriture | boued | boos (older boes) | bwyd | biadh | bia |
| house | maison | ti | chi | tŷ | taigh | teach (south tigh) |
| church | église | iliz | eglos | eglwys | eaglais | eaglais |
| person, man | personne, homme | den, gour | den, gour | dyn, gŵr | duine, fear | duine, fear |
| dog | chien, chienne | ki | ki | ci | cù | gadhar, madra (cú hound) |
| sell | vendre | gwerzhañ | gwertha | gwerthu | reic | díol, reic trade, íoc pay |
| eat | manger | debriñ | dybri | bwyta | ith (biadhaich feed) | ith (cothaigh feed) |
| drink | boire | evañ | eva | yfed | òl (archaic ibh) | ól (archaic ibh) |
| see | voir | gwelet | gweles | gweld | faic (fut. chì) | feic (south chí) |
| black | noir, noire | du | du | du | dubh | dubh |
| white | blanc, blanche | gwenn | gwynn | gwyn | bàn, geal (fionn 'fair') | fionn, bán, geal |
| green | vert, verte | gwer, glas | gwer, gwyrdh, glas | gwyrdd, glas | uaine, glas | uaine, glas |
| red | rouge | ruz | rudh | coch (also: rhudd) | dearg (hair, etc. ruadh) | dearg (hair, etc. rua) |
| yellow | jaune | melen | melyn | melyn | buidhe | buí |
| book | livre | levr | lyver | llyfr | leabhar | leabhar |
| day | jour, journée | deiz | dydh | dydd | latha | lá (also dé in names of weekdays) |
| year | an, année | bloaz | bloodh | blwyddyn | bliadhna | blian/bliain |
| beer | bière | korev (bier) | korev | cwrw | leann (cuirm) | leann, beoir, coirm ale |
| go | aller | mont | mones (mos) | mynd | rach (verbal noun dol) | téigh (verbal noun, dul) |
| come | venir | dont | dones | dod | thig (verbal noun, tighinn) | tar (participle, ag teacht) |
| cat | chat, chatte | kazh | kath | cath | cat | cat |
| live | vivre | bevañ | bewa | byw | beò | beo |
| dead | mort, morte | marv | marow | marw | marbh | marbh |
| name | nom | anv | hanow | enw | ainm | ainm |
| water | eau | dour | dowr | dŵr | uisge (dobhair) | uisce, dobhar |
| true | vrai, vraie | gwir | gwir | gwir | fìor | fíor |
| woman | femme | gwreg | gwreg | gwraig | bean | bean |
| sheep | mouton | dañvad | davas | dafad | caora 'sheep' (damh 'stag', 'ox';) | damh 'stag', 'ox'; caora 'sheep' |
| better | mieux | gwell, gwelloc'h | gwell | gwell | feàrr | níos fearr |
| say | dire | lavarout | leverel | siarad (also: llefaru) | can (labhair speak) | deir (labhair speak) |
| night | nuit | noz | nos | nôs | a-nochd 'tonight'; oidhche 'night' | anocht 'tonight'; oíche 'night' |
| root | racine | gwrizienn | gwreydhen | gwreiddyn | freumh | fréamh, (south préamh) |
| iron | fer | houarn | horn | haearn | iarann | iarann |
| summer | été | hañv | hav | haf | samhradh | samhradh |
| winter | hiver | goañv | gwav | gaeaf | geamhradh | geimhreadh |

== .bzh ==
.bzh is an approved Internet generic top-level domains intended for Brittany and the Breton culture and languages. In 2023, the Breton internet extension .bzh had more than 12,000 registrations. Alongside the promotion of the .bzh internet extension, the www.bzh association promotes other services to develop Brittany's image on the web: campaign for a Breton flag emoji, and email service.

== See also ==
- Armoricani
- Gaelic revival, Irish-language revival
- Julian Maunoir, 17th-century Breton-language orthographer
- List of Celtic-language media
- Stourm ar Brezhoneg, an association promoting the language
