= Stourm ar Brezhoneg =

Breton language pressure group

- Predecessor: Split from the Skol an Emsav movement
- Formation: March 1984
- Purpose: Promotion of the Breton language
- Region served: Brittany

Stourm ar Brezhoneg (SAB; French: Le Combat de la langue bretonne, roughly Struggle for the Breton Language) is a Breton association founded in 1984 advocating for official status for the Breton language in public life.

In particular, it has called for bilingual road signs, Breton-language television and radio programming, and the ability to use Breton in official matters such as in court and on the census. Its slogan is Brezhoneg, yezh ofisiel – "Breton, official language".

== Origins ==
In the early 1980s, the cultural movement Skol An Emsav actively promoted the use of Breton on road signs. Following internal disagreements, Stourm ar Brezhoneg was founded on a more radical basis in March 1984, and began to participate in protests and direct action. Activists faced numerous legal actions, often resulting in prison sentences in the 1980s. Several members are also part of Emgann, which split from Skol an Emsav in the same disputes, though SAB asserts its independence from any political party.

== Demands and tactics ==
=== Bilingual signage ===
Along with other groups it has campaigned for bilingual signage using the modern and standard nomenclature in Breton. Its actions have included the defacement of monolingual signage with coal tar. Their actions spurred the adoption of bilingual signage, as in Côtes-du-Nord in 1986 and in Finistère in 1990. Today, several areas have adopted bilingual signage.

=== Broadcasting in Breton ===
SAB protests against the restriction of programming in the Breton language on television stations. It has called for a boycott of the television license fee until broadcasts are made in Breton. The group also advocates for a Breton television channel. In the early 1990s, SAB regularly held gatherings at a TV antenna previously destroyed by the Breton Liberation Frontin the 1974 Roc'h Trédudon attack.

=== Use of Breton in public life ===
SAB advocates for the right to testify in Breton before the courts, write cheques in Breton, and calls for introducing Breton ATM and ticket distribution interfaces. It also advocates a boycott of the population census of France over demands that it include measures to count Breton speakers. On February 17, 1989 it occupied the French Embassy in Belgium. On June 2, 1989, it posted signs in Villers-Cotterêts in Aisne demanding the repeal of the 1539 ordinance mandating French in administration and justice.

In 2011, SAB and the Groupe d'Intervention pour la Réunification renewed demands for official status for the Breton language and the administrative unity of Brittany. New actions were launched in 2010 and 2011. In 2010, SAB claimed responsibility for the theft of city signs from Solesmes to protest the language policies of François Fillon. In 2011, they stole signs from Sablé-sur-Sarthe and La Roche-sur-Yon, the respective hometowns of Fillon and Jacques Auxiette.
