= Radio Kerne =

French radio station

France
- Frequencies: 90.2 MHz (Quimper); 92.0 MHz (Douarnenez); 97.5 MHz (Concarneau); DAB (Nantes)
- RDS: _KERNE_

Programming
- Language: Breton language

History
- First air date: 1998

Links
- Website: www.radiokerne.bzh/br/

Radio Kerne is a radio station that broadcasts exclusively in the Breton language. It broadcasts on FM in south Finistère, the westernmost département of Brittany, France, and on the Internet to the rest of the world. It plays local music from Brittany and world music. It is supported by both the local government of Finistère and the regional government of Brittany.

Radio Kerne was established in 1998. In 2019, it expanded its broadcast area to Nantes with the opening of a new digital radio multiplex there.

== See also ==
- List of Celtic language media
