= Trégorrois Breton dialect =

Dialect of Breton

Tregorrois
- Brezhoneg Treger
- Native to: Brittany
- Region: Trégor
- Ethnicity: Bretons
- Language family: Indo-European: Celtic; Brittonic; Southwestern Brittonic; Breton; Tregorrois
- Writing system: Latin script (Breton alphabet)

Language codes
- ISO 639-3: –
- Glottolog: treg1244
- Linguasphere: 50-ABB-bd

Trégorrois Breton is the dialect of Breton spoken in Trégor (Bro-Dreger in Breton).

A map of the dialects of Brittany

== Distinguishing characteristics ==
Trégorrois differs from other varieties of the language in a number of ways:

- It always uses the possessive hon (often pronounced hom) whereas the other dialects use hol before l, hon before n, d, t, h and vowels, and hor before all others (these other forms are nonetheless understood because of exposure to hymns and songs, for instance)
- After the possessive hon, Trégorrois makes a sibilant variation (e.g., where Vannetais uses /hon tu/, or Cornouaillais and Léonard hon ti, Trégorrois says hon zi)
- The h is very aspirated (e.g., in he)
- Different from Léonard, z is generally not pronounced (nor is it in Cornouaillais and Vannetais)
- The tonic accent is very strong (for example, bihan is pronounced /b:in/)
- Certain constructions are preferred. For instance, me a wel ac'hanout or plijet on ouzh da welout instead of plijet on o welout ac'hanout
- Frequently the 'd' will not mutate into a z where it would in the other dialects (for example, ar paotr a dañs)
- The glyph w is generally pronounced ou (e.g., war is pronounced /uar/), unlike Léonard dialect where it is pronounced /v/
- The r is pronounced as a tap: ɾ

There are several other pronunciation details. For example, an heol is pronounced /ãn heul/ (compare to the /ar mur/ of Kemper). This is possible in Trégorrois because the very strong aspiration of /h/ avoids any confusion with the word 'oil' (eoul).

Finally, future endings are different. The future of Middle Breton was -homp, -het, -hont. Trégorrois moved from h to f (forms in -fomp, -fet, -font, etc.). (Compare with the forms -ahomp, -ahet, -ahont of Vannetais, due to the appearance of an -a- elision (pronounced /e/).

== Sources ==
This article is based on the French-language Wikipedia's article: Breton trégorrois.
