= Cuirm =

Traditional variety of Scottish ale

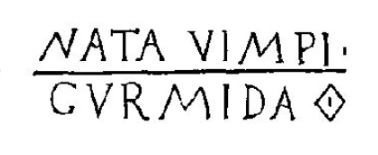
Gaulish inscription on spindle whorl, found in Sennecey-le-Grand

Cuirm was a kind of beer or ale brewed in the Gàidhealtachd at one time. It was a powerful, intoxicating liquor made from barley, and being of course used at many feasts, the word cuirm came ultimately to mean a feast itself. It is supposed by some to have been the same as whisky, but the process of brewing being so much easier and cheaper than distilling, it was more probably a strong kind of beer. It may be related to "barley bree".
