= Ofis Publik ar Brezhoneg =

Language advocacy organization

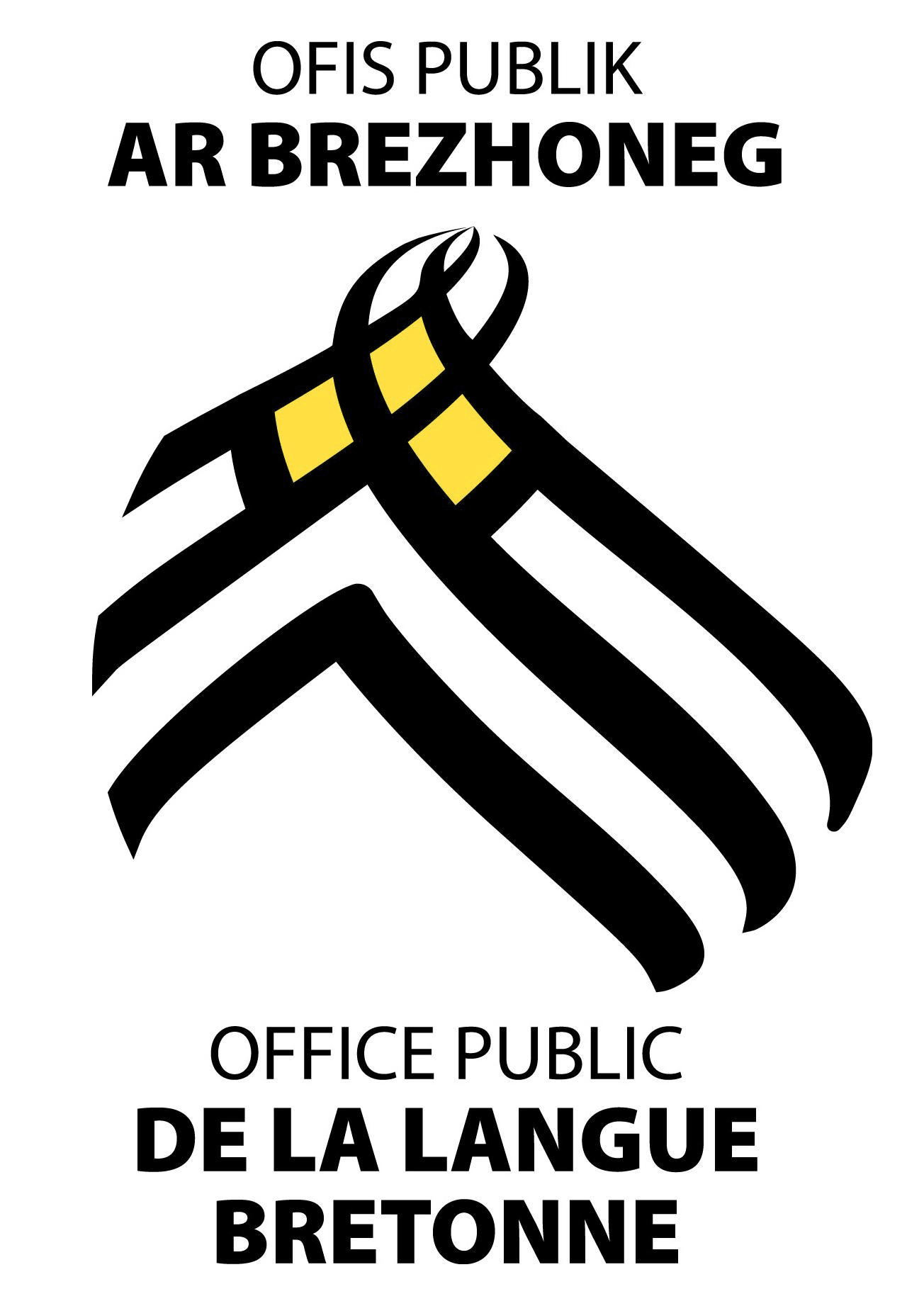
The logo of Ofis Publik ar Brezhoneg (In Breton and French)

The Public Office for the Breton Language (Breton: Ofis Publik ar Brezhoneg; French: Office public de la langue bretonne) was established on 15 October 2010 as a public institution, with state and regional cooperation and funding, to promote and develop teaching and use of the Breton language in daily life. It is an example of language revival efforts for minority languages in France.

== Mission ==
One of its missions is to collect and distribute socio-linguistic data, in order to approach language revival with a basis in science and facts. Its remit is to collect data on the Breton language (Arsellva ar brezhoneg) and publish it, and advise communes on bilingual signage and place names.

It supports TermBret, the cooperative terminology service which publishes glossaries. In addition, it assists individuals, administrations and businesses who want to use the Breton language. (From 1 July 1999 to September 15, 1999, 42 administrations, associations or companies have made an appealed to the national government to allow use of Breton as an official language.)

== History ==
It was established to replace the Ofis ar Brezhoneg/Office de la langue bretonne, which had been created on 1 May 1999 by the Region of Brittany. That office had a similar mission and worked mostly to promote use of Breton in daily life. In 2001 it initiated Ya d'ar brezhoneg (French: Oui au breton, English: Yes to Breton), an effort to encourage businesses to adopt use of Breton and provide bilingual resources, as well as to encourage communes to establish bilingual signs and tourist materials.

== Finance and organisation ==
The Office is now an Établissement public de coopération culturelle, a public institution run by a board of directors. They represent local authorities and the French state. It was presided over by Lena Louarn, a councillor elected in the Regional Council of Brittany until October 2021, when she was succeeded by regional councillor and deputy Paul Molac. The Office is based in Carhaix, where its director Fulup Jacq works. The Observatory of the Breton Language (l'Observatoire de la langue bretonne), led by the deputy director Olier ar Mogn, is located in Rennes.

Before October 2010, the OPB was an independent regional association, led by Lena Louarn between 1999 and 2010. Its budget of €1 million was primarily funded by the Brittany Region.

== Breton language ==
The Office participates in the promotion of Breton courses for adults. It has published data on participation in and centers for Breton courses for adults:

In the year 1998–1999, 9,300 adults followed a course (e.g. evening courses, correspondence). Of those, 1,200 were in Upper Brittany (550 in Ille-et-Vilaine and 462 in Loire-Atlantique). At the time, a total of 165 organizations organised evening courses in Brittany and 28 outside Brittany (of the latter, 15 are in the region of Paris).

In 2003, the Office prepared and published a road map of Brittany in the Breton language. (The map includes Loire-Atlantique, which was historically considered part of the region until 1941.)

In June 2024, the Office opened "Desketa", its free website for learning Breton.

== See also ==
- Cornish Language Partnership (Keskowethyans an Taves Kernewek) – a comparable body for the Cornish language.
- Welsh Language Commissioner (Comisiynydd y Gymraeg) – a Welsh Government officer with responsibility for enforcing Welsh-language policy.
- Foras na Gaeilge – an all-Ireland board for the Irish language.
- Bòrd na Gàidhlig – a comparable body for Scottish Gaelic.
- Coonceil ny Gaelgey – a comparable body for the Manx language.
