= Celtic languages =

Language branch

Celtic
- Geographic distribution: Formerly widespread in much of Europe and central Anatolia; today Cornwall, Wales, Scotland, Ireland, Brittany, the Isle of Man, Chubut Province (Y Wladfa), and Nova Scotia
- Native speakers: ~830 000 fluent speakers ~3 350 000 reported at least some knowledge
- Linguistic classification: Indo-European: Italo-Celtic?; Celtic
- Proto-language: Proto-Celtic
- Subdivisions: Brythonic; Goidelic; Gaulish †; Lepontic †; Celtiberian †; Callaecian †; ?Pritenic †; Lusitanian (uncertain) †

Language codes
- ISO 639-2 / 5: cel
- Glottolog: celt1248
- Linguasphere: 50=
- Distribution of Celtic speakers: Area of the Hallstatt culture in the 6th century BC. Great Celtic expansion, c.275 BC. Unclear Celtic affiliation (Lusitanians and Ligurians) The area of the Celtic languages today

The Celtic languages (/ˈkɛltɪk/ KEL-tik) are a branch of the Indo-European language family, descended from the reconstructed Proto-Celtic language. The term Celtic was first used to describe this language group by Edward Lhuyd in 1707, following Paul-Yves Pezron, who made the explicit link between the Celts described by classical writers and the Welsh and Breton languages.

During the first millennium BC, Celtic languages were spoken across much of Europe and central Anatolia. Today, they are restricted to the northwestern fringe of Europe and a few diaspora communities. There are six living languages: the four continuously living languages Breton, Irish, Scottish Gaelic and Welsh, and the two revived languages Cornish and Manx. All are minority languages in their respective countries, though there are continuing efforts at revitalisation. Welsh is an official language in Wales and Irish is an official language across the island of Ireland and of the European Union. Welsh is the only Celtic language not classified as endangered by UNESCO. The Cornish and Manx languages became extinct in modern times but have been revived. Each now has several hundred second-language speakers.

Irish, Manx and Scottish Gaelic form the Goidelic languages, while Welsh, Cornish and Breton are Brittonic. All of these are Insular Celtic languages, since Breton, the only living Celtic language spoken in continental Europe, is descended from the language of settlers from Britain. There are a number of extinct attested Continental Celtic languages: Galatian, Lepontic, Gaulish, Celtiberian and Callaecian, where the last two form Hispano-Celtic subbranch. Beyond that, there is no agreement on the subdivisions of the Celtic language family. Traditionally, they are considered to be divided into P-Celtic and Q-Celtic. However, Gaulish is considered more closely related to Insular Celtic than either of these two are to Celtiberian; proposed connection between Gaulish and Insular Celtic is called Nuclear Celtic.

The Celtic languages have a rich literary tradition. The earliest specimens of written Celtic are Lepontic inscriptions from the 6th century BC in the Alps. Early Continental inscriptions used the Italic and Paleohispanic scripts. Between the 4th and 10th centuries, Irish and Pictish were written in a native script, Ogham, whose derivation is unclear, but the Latin script eventually came to be used for all Celtic languages.

== Living languages ==
SIL Ethnologue lists six living Celtic languages, of which four have retained a substantial number of native speakers. These are: the Goidelic languages (Irish and Scottish Gaelic, both descended from Middle Irish) and the Brittonic languages (Welsh and Breton, descended from Common Brittonic). The other two, Cornish (Brittonic) and Manx (Goidelic), died out in modern times with their presumed last native speakers in 1777 and 1974 respectively. Revitalisation movements in the 2000s led to the re-emergence of native speakers of both languages following their adoption by adults and children.

=== Demographics ===
| Language | Native name | Grouping | Number of native speakers | Number of skilled speakers | Area of origin (still spoken) | Regulated by/language body | Estimated number of speakers in major cities |
|---|---|---|---|---|---|---|---|
| Irish | Gaeilge / Gaedhilg / Gaelainn / Gaeilig / Gaeilic | Goidelic | 40,000–80,000; In the Republic of Ireland, 73,803 people use Irish daily outside the education system. Northern Ireland: 5,971 (2021) Canada: 530 (2021) | Total speakers: 2,024,095; Republic of Ireland: 1,774,437 (2011); 1,873,997 (of whom 788,927 (14.6% of the population) could speak it "well")(2022) Northern Ireland: 126,743 (2021); United States: 18,000; Canada: 5,355 (2021) | Gaeltacht of Ireland | Foras na Gaeilge | Dublin: 184,140; Galway: 37,614; Cork: 57,318; Belfast: 14,086 |
| Welsh | Cymraeg / Y Gymraeg | Brittonic | 538,000 (17.8% of the population of Wales) claim that they "can speak Welsh" (2021) Canada: 855 (2021) | Total speakers: ≈ 989,500; Wales: 828,500 speakers (26.9% of the population) (2025); England: est. 150,000 (2011); Chubut Province, Argentina: est. 5,000 (2008); United States: 2,003 (2021); Canada: 2,260 (2021) Australia: 1,737 (2021) | Wales | Welsh Language Commissioner; The Welsh Government (previously the Welsh Language Board, Bwrdd yr Iaith Gymraeg) | Cardiff: 96,800; Swansea: 45,085; Newport: 18,490; Bangor: 7,190 |
| Breton | Brezhoneg | Brittonic | 206,000 | 356,000 | Brittany | Ofis Publik ar Brezhoneg | Rennes: 7,000; Brest: 40,000; Nantes: 4,000 |
| Scottish Gaelic | Gàidhlig | Goidelic | Scotland: 69,701 (2022) Canada: 385 (2021) | Scotland: 87,056 (2011) (1.7% of the population); 130,156 (2022) (2.5% of the population) Canada: 2,170 (of whom 630 in Nova Scotia) (2021) | Scotland | Bòrd na Gàidhlig | Glasgow: 5,726; Edinburgh: 3,220; Aberdeen: 1,397 |
| Cornish | Kernowek / Kernewek | Brittonic | 563 | 2,500 - 5,000 | Cornwall | Akademi Kernewek; Cornish Language Partnership (Keskowethyans an Taves Kernewek) | Truro: 118 |
| Manx | Gaelg / Gailck | Goidelic | 100+, including a small number of children who are new native speakers | 2,223 have some skills in Manx, of whom 2,023 could speak it (2021) | Isle of Man | Coonceil ny Gaelgey | Douglas: 507 |

=== Mixed languages ===
- Beurla Reagaird, Highland travellers' language
- Shelta, based largely on Irish and Hiberno-English (some 86,000 speakers in 2009).

== Classification ==
Classification of Celtic languages according to Insular vs. Continental hypothesis. (click to enlarge)

Classification of Indo-European languages. (click to enlarge)

The Celtic nations, where Celtic languages are spoken today, or were spoken into the modern era: Ireland (Irish) Scotland (Scottish Gaelic) Isle of Man (Manx) Wales (Welsh) Cornwall (Cornish) Brittany (Breton)

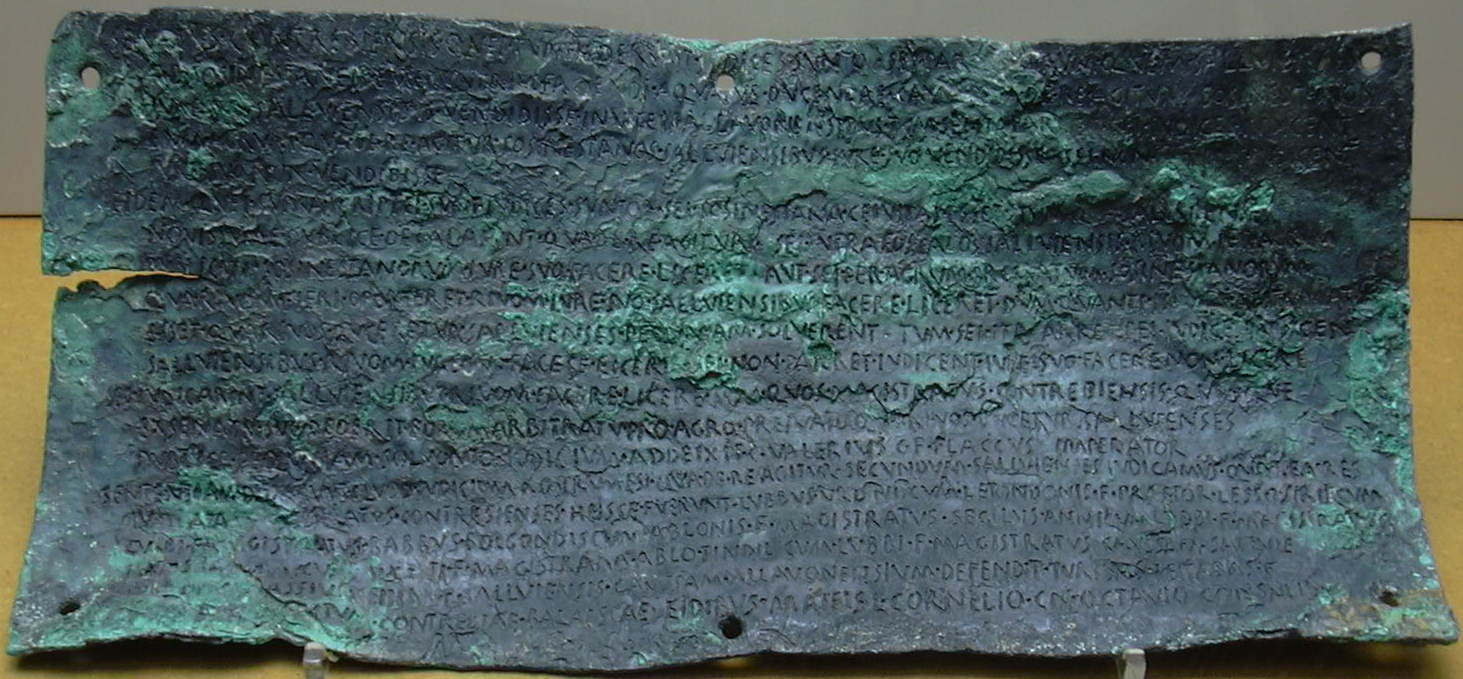
The second of the four Botorrita plaques. The third plaque is the longest text discovered in any ancient Celtic language. However, this plaque is inscribed in Latin script.

There does not exist a single, accepted classification of branches inside Celtic; only groups of languages created based on different theories and approaches to Celtic history. Most notable and commonly accepted groups include:

- Continental Celtic languages, a group of extinct Celtic languages spoken in the continental Europe.
- Insular Celtic languages, spoken in the British Isles and Brittany in modernity.
- Hispano-Celtic languages, a group of Celtic languages spoken on the Iberian peninsula, including Celtiberian and Callaecian.
  - Celtiberian, also called Eastern or Northeastern Hispano-Celtic, was spoken in the ancient Iberian Peninsula, in the eastern part of Old Castile and south of Aragon (modern provinces: Segovia, Burgos, Soria, Guadalajara, Cuenca, Zaragoza and Teruel) The relationship of with Callaecian, in northwest Iberia, is uncertain. It is sometimes grouped as part of Continental Celtic languages.
  - Callaecian, also known as Western or Northwestern Hispano-Celtic, was spoken in the northwest of the peninsula (modern Northern Portugal, and the Spanish regions of Galicia, Asturias and northwestern Castile and León).
- Lepontic, spoken on the continent, the oldest attested Celtic language (from the 6th century BC). Anciently spoken in Switzerland and in Northern-Central Italy. Coins with Lepontic inscriptions have been found in Noricum and Gallia Narbonensis.
- Gaulish language, once spoken in a wide arc from Belgium and to modern-day Turkey, but all extinct since 7-8th centuries AD. Includes several dialects, whose level of divergence is uncertain:
  - Transalpine Gaulish, spoken in the modern area of France, Switzerland and parts of Germany.
  - Cisalpine Gaulish, a proposed language documented in inscriptions, distinct from Transalpine Gaulish and closer to Lepontic, spoken in Northern Italy until the 1st century BC.
  - Galatian, spoken in central Anatolia (region of Galatia) potentially for as long as 6th century AD.
- Brittonic group, spoken in Great Britain and Brittany. Including the living languages Breton, Cornish, and Welsh, and the lost Cumbric and potentially Pictish. Before the arrival of Scotti on the Isle of Man in the 9th century, the island may have spoken a Brythonic language. The theory of a Brittonic Ivernic language predating Goidelic speech in Ireland has been suggested, but is widely rejected.
- Pritenic, once spoken in most of Scotland - a hypothetical subgroup of Insular Celtic from which Pictish language descended. Pritenic is often regarded as related to Brittonic, but distinct. Some earlier theories consider Pictish a pre-Indo-European language, but this idea is no longer widely supported.
- Goidelic group, including the extant Irish, Manx, and Scottish Gaelic, spoken in modern Scotland, Ireland and Isle of Man.

=== Continental/Insular Celtic and P/Q-Celtic hypotheses ===
Scholarly handling of Celtic languages has been contentious owing to scarcity of primary source data. Some scholars (such as Cowgill 1975; McCone 1991, 1992; and Schrijver 1995) posit that the primary distinction is between Continental Celtic and Insular Celtic, arguing that the differences between the Goidelic and Brittonic languages arose after these split off from the Continental Celtic languages. Other scholars (such as Schmidt 1988) make the primary distinction between P-Celtic and Q-Celtic languages based on the replacement of initial Q by initial P in some words. Most of the Gallic and Brittonic languages are P-Celtic, while the Goidelic and Hispano-Celtic languages are Q-Celtic. The P-Celtic languages (also called Gallo-Brittonic) are sometimes seen (for example by Koch 1992) as a central innovating area as opposed to the more conservative peripheral Q-Celtic languages. According to Ranko Matasović in the introduction to his 2009 Etymological Dictionary of Proto-Celtic: "Celtiberian ... is almost certainly an independent branch on the Celtic genealogical tree, one that became separated from the others very early."

The Breton language is Brittonic, not Gaulish; though there may be some input from the latter, having been introduced from Southwestern regions of Britain in the post-Roman era. In the P/Q classification schema, the first language to split off from Proto-Celtic was Gaelic. It has characteristics that some scholars see as archaic, but others see as also being in the Brittonic languages (see Schmidt). In the Insular/Continental classification schema, the split of the former into Gaelic and Brittonic is seen as being late.

The distinction of Celtic into these four sub-families most likely occurred about 900 BC according to Gray & Atkinson but, because of estimation uncertainty, it could be any time between 1200 and 800 BC. However, they only considered Gaelic and Brythonic. A controversial paper by Forster & Toth included Gaulish and put the break-up much earlier at 3200 BC ± 1500 years. They support the Insular Celtic hypothesis. The early Celts were commonly associated with the archaeological Urnfield culture, the Hallstatt culture, and the La Tène culture, though the earlier assumption of association between language and culture is now considered to be less strong.

There are legitimate scholarly arguments for both the Insular Celtic hypothesis and the P-/Q-Celtic hypothesis. Proponents of each schema dispute the accuracy and usefulness of the other's categories. However, since the 1970s the division into Insular and Continental Celtic has become the more widely held view (Cowgill 1975; McCone 1991, 1992; Schrijver 1995), but in the middle of the 1980s, the P-/Q-Celtic theory found new supporters (Lambert 1994), because of the inscription on the Larzac piece of lead (1983), the analysis of which reveals another common phonetical innovation -nm- > -nu (Gaelic ainm / Gaulish anuana, Old Welsh enuein 'names'), that is less accidental than only one. The discovery of a third common innovation would allow the specialists to come to the conclusion of a Gallo-Brittonic dialect (Schmidt 1986; Fleuriot 1986).

The interpretation of this and further evidence is still quite contested, and the main argument for Insular Celtic is connected with the development of verbal morphology and the syntax in Irish and British Celtic, which Schumacher regards as convincing, while he considers the P-Celtic/Q-Celtic division unimportant and treats Gallo-Brittonic as an outdated theory. Stifter affirms that the Gallo-Brittonic view is "out of favour" in the scholarly community as of 2008 and the Insular Celtic hypothesis "widely accepted".

When referring only to the modern Celtic languages, since no Continental Celtic language has living descendants, "Q-Celtic" is equivalent to "Goidelic" and "P-Celtic" is equivalent to "Brittonic".

How the family tree of the Celtic languages is ordered depends on which hypothesis is used:

"Insular Celtic hypothesis"

- Proto-Celtic
  - Continental Celtic †
    - Celtiberian †
    - Callaecian †
    - Gaulish †
  - Insular Celtic
    - Brittonic
    - Goidelic

"P/Q-Celtic hypothesis"

- Proto-Celtic
  - Q-Celtic
    - Celtiberian †
    - Callaecian †
    - Goidelic
  - P-Celtic
    - Gaulish †
    - Brittonic
    - Pritenic? †

=== Eska (2010) ===
Eska evaluates the evidence as supporting the following tree, based on shared innovations, though it is not always clear that the innovations are not areal features. It seems likely that Celtiberian split off before Cisalpine Celtic, but the evidence for this is not robust. On the other hand, the unity of Gaulish, Goidelic, and Brittonic is reasonably secure. Schumacher (2004, p. 86) had already cautiously considered this grouping to be likely genetic, based, among others, on the shared reformation of the sentence-initial, fully inflecting relative pronoun *i̯os, *i̯ā, *i̯od into an uninflected enclitic particle. Eska sees Cisalpine Gaulish as more akin to Lepontic than to Transalpine Gaulish.

- Celtic
  - Hispano-Celtic †
    - Celtiberian †
    - Callaecian †
  - Nuclear Celtic
    - Cisalpine Celtic: Lepontic → Cisalpine Gaulish †
    - Core Celtic (secure)
      - Transalpine Gaulish † ("Transalpine Celtic")
      - Insular Celtic
        - Goidelic
        - Brittonic

Eska considers a division of Transalpine–Goidelic–Brittonic into Transalpine and Insular Celtic to be most probable because of the greater number of innovations in Insular Celtic than in P-Celtic, and because the Insular Celtic languages were probably not in great enough contact for those innovations to spread as part of a sprachbund. However, if they have another explanation (such as an SOV substratum language), then it is possible that P-Celtic is a valid clade, and the top branching would be:

- Core Celtic (P-Celtic hypothesis)
  - Goidelic
  - Gallo-Brittonic
    - Transalpine Gaulish ("Transalpine Celtic") †
    - Brittonic

=== Italo-Celtic ===
Within the Indo-European family, the Celtic languages have sometimes been placed with the Italic languages in a common Italo-Celtic subfamily. This hypothesis fell somewhat out of favour after reexamination by American linguist Calvert Watkins in 1966. Irrespectively, some scholars such as Ringe, Warnow and Taylor and many others have argued in favour of an Italo-Celtic grouping in 21st century theses.

== Possible members ==
Several poorly documented languages may have been Celtic; often referred to as Para-Celtic:

- Noric, a hypothetical language documented in the area of modern Austria and Slovenia through several inscriptions. Sometimes referred to as the language of all Eastern Celts (modern areas of the Czech Republic, Croatia, Hungary, Slovakia and others), dated to the 2nd century AD. Noric inscriptions are written in the Old Italic alphabet, and are considered unique as the vernacular writing traditions of Northern Italy are considered to have ceased in the late 1st century BC. The question of the language's existence is open, as two inscriptions are not enough for a good, sourced hypothesis.
- Ancient Belgian is a hypothetical language spoken in the region of Belgica, seen by most linguists as Celtic, though some scholars propose Germanic or distinct Indo-European origin. Other theories suggest relations to Tyrsenian family.
- Camunic is an extinct language spoken in the first millennium BC in the Val Camonica and Valtellina valleys of the Central Alps. It has recently been proposed that it was a Celtic language.
- Ivernic. a P-Celtic language spoken in Ireland by the Iverni tribe, proposed by T. F. O'Rahilly, but the theory has been refuted and is not widely accepted by experts.
- Ligurian, on the northern Mediterranean coast straddling the southeast French and northwest Italian coasts, including parts of Tuscany, Elba and Corsica. Xavier Delamarre argues that Ligurian was a Celtic language similar to Gaulish. The Ligurian-Celtic question is also discussed by Barruol (1999). Ancient Ligurian is listed as either Celtic (epigraphic), or Para-Celtic (onomastic).
- Lusitanian, spoken in the area between the Douro and Tagus rivers of western Iberia (a region straddling the present border of Portugal and Spain). Known from only five inscriptions and various place names. It is an Indo-European language and some scholars have proposed that it may be a para-Celtic language that evolved alongside Celtic or formed a dialect continuum or sprachbund with Tartessian and Callaecian. This is tied to a theory of an Iberian origin for the Celtic languages. It is also possible that the Q-Celtic languages alone, including Goidelic, originated in western Iberia (a theory that was first put forward by Edward Lhuyd in 1707) or shared a common linguistic ancestor with Lusitanian. Other scholars see greater linguistic affinities between Lusitanian, Old Gallo-Italic (particularly with Ligurian) and Old European. Prominent modern linguists such as Ellis Evans, believe Callaecian-Lusitanian was in fact one same language (not separate languages) of the "P" Celtic variant.
- Rhaetic, spoken in central Switzerland, Tyrol in Austria, and the Alpine regions of northeast Italy. Documented by a limited number of short inscriptions (found through Northern Italy and Western Austria) in two variants of the Etruscan alphabet. Its linguistic categorisation is not clearly established, and it presents a confusing mixture of what appear to be Etruscan, Indo-European, and uncertain other elements. Howard Hayes Scullard argues that Rhaetian was also a Celtic language. However, today most scholars believe that Rhaetic was a Tyrrhenian language closely related to Etruscan.
- Tartessian, spoken in the southwest of the Iberia Peninsula (mainly southern Portugal and southwest Spain). Tartessian is known by 95 inscriptions, with the longest having 82 readable signs. John T. Koch argues that Tartessian was a Celtic language.

== Characteristics ==
Although there are many differences between the individual Celtic languages, they do show many family resemblances.

- consonant mutations (Insular Celtic only)
- inflected prepositions (Insular Celtic only)
- two grammatical genders (modern Insular Celtic only; Old Irish and the Continental languages had three genders, although Gaulish may have merged the neuter and masculine in its later forms)
- a vigesimal number system (counting by twenties)
  - Cornish hwetek ha dew ugens "fifty-six" (literally "sixteen and two twenty")
  - 'Yan Tan Tethera' or old sheep counting talk, is a vigesimal counting system generally understood to be a relic of Cumbric and/or other Brittonic languages
- verb–subject–object (VSO) word order (probably Insular Celtic only)
- an interplay between the subjunctive, future, imperfect, and habitual, to the point that some tenses and moods have ousted others
- an impersonal or autonomous verb form serving as a passive or intransitive
  - Welsh dysgaf "I teach" vs. dysgir "is taught, one teaches"
  - Irish múinim "I teach" vs. múintear "is taught, one teaches"
- no infinitives, replaced by a quasi-nominal verb form called the verbal noun or verbnoun
- frequent use of vowel mutation as a morphological device, e.g. formation of plurals, verbal stems, etc.
- use of preverbal particles to signal either subordination or illocutionary force of the following clause
  - mutation-distinguished subordinators/relativisers
  - particles for negation, interrogation, and occasionally for affirmative declarations
- pronouns positioned between particles and verbs
- lack of simple verb for the imperfective "have" process, with possession conveyed by a composite structure, usually BE + preposition
  - Cornish Yma kath dhymm "I have a cat", literally "there is a cat to me"
  - Welsh Mae cath gyda fi "I have a cat", literally "a cat is with me"
  - Irish Tá cat agam "I have a cat", literally "there is a cat at me"
- use of periphrastic constructions to express verbal tense, voice, or aspectual distinctions
- distinction by function of the two versions of BE verbs traditionally labelled substantive (or existential) and copula
- bifurcated demonstrative structure
- suffixed pronominal supplements, called confirming or supplementary pronouns
- use of singulars or special forms of counted nouns, and use of a singulative suffix to make singular forms from plurals, where older singulars have disappeared

Examples:

Irish: Ná bac le mac an bhacaigh is ní bhacfaidh mac an bhacaigh leat.
(Literal translation) Do not bother with son the beggar's and not will-bother son the beggar's with-you.
- bhacaigh is the genitive of bacach. The igh the result of affection; the ⟨bh⟩ is the lenited form of ⟨b⟩.
- leat is the second person singular inflected form of the preposition le.
- The order is verb–subject–object (VSO) in the second half. Compare this to English or French (and possibly Continental Celtic) which are normally subject–verb–object in word order.

Welsh: pedwar ar bymtheg a phedwar ugain
(Literally) four on fifteen and four twenties
- bymtheg is a mutated form of pymtheg, which is pump ("five") plus deg ("ten"). Likewise, phedwar is a mutated form of pedwar.
- The multiples of ten are deg, ugain, deg ar hugain, deugain, hanner cant, trigain, deg a thrigain, pedwar ugain, deg a phedwar ugain, cant.

=== Comparison table ===
The lexical similarity between the different Celtic languages is apparent in their core vocabulary, especially in terms of actual pronunciation. Moreover, the phonetic differences between languages are often the product of regular sound change (i.e. lenition of /b/ into /v/ or Ø).

The table below has words in the modern languages that were inherited direct from Proto-Celtic, as well as a few old borrowings from Latin that made their way into all the daughter languages. There is often a closer match between Welsh, Breton and Cornish on the one hand and Irish, Scottish Gaelic and Manx on the other. For a fuller list of comparisons, see the Swadesh list for Celtic.

| English | Brittonic | | | Goidelic | | |
| English | Welsh | Breton | Cornish | Irish Gaelic | Scottish Gaelic | Manx |
|---|---|---|---|---|---|---|
| bee | gwenynen | gwenanenn | gwenenen | beach | seillean | shellan |
| big | mawr | meur | meur | mór | mòr | mooar |
| dog | ci | ki | ki | madra, gadhar (cú "hound") | cù | coo |
| fish | pysgodyn^{†} | pesk^{†} | pysk^{†} | iasc | iasg | yeeast |
| full | llawn | leun | leun | lán | làn | lane |
| goat | gafr | gavr | gaver | gabhar | gobhar | goayr |
| house | tŷ | ti | chi | teach, tigh | taigh | thie |
| lip (anatomical) | gwefus | gweuz | gweus | liopa, beol | bile | meill |
| mouth of a river | aber | aber | aber | inbhear | inbhir | inver |
| four | pedwar | pevar | peswar | ceathair, cheithre | ceithir | kiare |
| night | nos | noz | nos | oíche (anocht "tonight") | oidhche (a-nochd) | oie (noght) |
| number^{†} | rhif, nifer^{†} | niver^{†} | niver^{†} | uimhir | àireamh | earroo |
| three | tri | tri | tri | trí | trì | tree |
| milk | llaeth^{†} | laezh^{†} | leth^{†} | bainne, leacht | bainne, leachd | bainney |
| you (sg) | ti | te | ty | tú, thú | thu, tu | oo |
| star | seren | steredenn | steren | réalta | reult, rionnag | rollage |
| today | heddiw | hiziv | hedhyw | inniu | an-diugh | jiu |
| tooth | dant | dant | dans | fiacail, déad | fiacaill, deud | feeackle |
| (to) fall | cwympo | kouezhañ | kodha | tit(im) | tuit(eam) | tuitt(ym) |
| (to) smoke | ysmygu | mogediñ, butuniñ | megi | caith(eamh) tobac | smocadh | toghtaney, smookal |
| (to) whistle | chwibanu | c'hwibanat | hwibana | feadáil | fead | fed |
| time | amser | amzer | amser | aimsir | aimsir | traa |
| weather | tywydd | amzer | kewer | aimsir | aimsir | emshyr |

^{†} Borrowings from Latin

Where the Welsh has separate masculine and feminine forms, the masculine form is shown.

The Breton is a special case arising from the dual meaning of French "temps".

=== Examples ===
Article 1 of the Universal Declaration of Human Rights: All human beings are born free and equal in dignity and rights. They are endowed with reason and conscience and should act towards one another in a spirit of brotherhood.

- Irish: Saolaítear gach duine den chine daonna saor agus comhionann i ndínit agus i gcearta. Tá bua an réasúin agus an choinsiasa acu agus ba cheart dóibh gníomhú i dtreo a chéile i spiorad an bhráithreachais.
- Manx: Ta dagh ooilley pheiagh ruggit seyr as corrym ayns ard-cheim as kiartyn. Ren Jee feoiltaghey resoon as cooinsheanse orroo as by chair daue ymmyrkey ry cheilley myr braaraghyn.
- Scottish Gaelic: Tha gach uile dhuine air a bhreith saor agus co-ionnan ann an urram 's ann an còirichean. Tha iad air am breith le reusan is le cogais agus mar sin bu chòir dhaibh a bhith beò nam measg fhèin ann an spiorad bràthaireil.
- Breton: Dieub ha par en o dellezegezh hag o gwirioù eo ganet an holl dud. Poell ha skiant zo dezho ha dleout a reont bevañ an eil gant egile en ur spered a genvreudeuriezh.
- Cornish: Genys frank ha par yw oll tus an bys yn aga dynita hag yn aga gwiryow. Enduys yns gans reson ha kowses hag y tal dhedha omdhon an eyl orth y gila yn spyrys a vrederedh.
- Welsh: Genir pawb yn rhydd ac yn gydradd â'i gilydd mewn urddas a hawliau. Fe'u cynysgaeddir â rheswm a chydwybod, a dylai pawb ymddwyn y naill at y llall mewn ysbryd cymodlon.

== See also ==
- Ogham
- Celts
- Celts (modern)
- A Swadesh list of the modern Celtic languages
- Celtic Congress
- Celtic League
- Continental Celtic languages
- Italo-Celtic
- Language family
