= Luca Rossetti =

Luca Rossetti may refer to:

- Luca Rossetti (painter), Italian painter and architect of the 18th century
- Luca Rossetti (racing driver), Italian rally driver

== See also ==
- Luca Rossettini
