= Continental Celtic languages =

Language group

Continental Celtic
- Geographic distribution: Continental Europe, Anatolia
- Linguistic classification: Indo-European: Celtic; Continental Celtic
- Subdivisions: Gaulish; Hispano-Celtic; Lepontic; Noric?; Callaecian

Language codes
- Glottolog: None
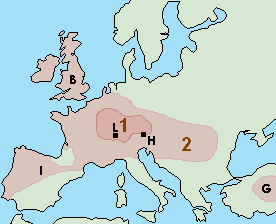
- Celtic languages during the Iron Age and classical Antiquity. 1: early Iron Age core region (Hallstatt -H-, early La Tène -L-) 2: assumed Celtic expansion by the 4th century BC L: La Tène site H: Hallstatt site I: Iberia B: British Isles G: Galatia, settled in the 3rd century BC (after 279 BC)

The Continental Celtic languages are the now-extinct group of the Celtic languages that were spoken on the continent of Europe and in central Anatolia, as distinguished from the Insular Celtic languages of the British Isles and Brittany. Continental Celtic is mostly a geographic, rather than strictly linguistic, grouping of the ancient Celtic languages.

These languages were spoken by the people known to Roman and Greek writers as the Keltoi, Celtae, Galli, and Galatae. They were spoken in an area arcing from the northern half of Iberia in the west to north of Belgium, and east to the Carpathian basin and the Balkans as Noric, and in inner Anatolia (modern day Turkey) as Galatian.

Even though Breton has been spoken in Continental Europe since at least the 6th century AD, it is not considered one of the Continental Celtic languages, as it is a Brittonic language, like Cornish and Welsh. A Gaulish substratum in Breton has been suggested, but that is debated.

== Attested languages ==
It is likely that Celts spoke dozens of different related languages and dialects across Europe in pre-Roman times, but only a small number are attested:

- Lepontic (6th to 4th century BC) was spoken on the southern side of the Alps. It is evidenced in a number of inscriptions as well as place names.
- Gaulish (3rd century BC to 5th (?) century AD) was the main language spoken in greater Gaul. This is often considered to be divided into three dialects, Cisalpine (spoken in what is now Italy), Transalpine (spoken in what is now France), and Galatian (3rd century BC to 4th or 6th century AD), which was spoken in the region of Ankara of what is now central Turkey. It is evidenced in a number of inscriptions as well as place names and tribal names in writings of classical authors. It may have been a substratum to Breton (see below).
- Noric, a hypothetical not widely accepted language, which refers to the Celtic spoken in Central and Eastern Europe. The linguistic features that can be garnered from the records suggest that, by and large, the language was similar to Gaulish. It was spoken in Austria and Slovenia, with only two inscriptions being the only potential evidence.
- Celtiberian or Northeastern Hispano-Celtic (3rd to 1st century BC) is the name given to the language in northeast Iberia, between the headwaters of the Douro, Tagus, Júcar and Turía rivers and the Ebro river. It is attested in some 200 inscriptions as well as place names. It is distinct from Iberian.
- Gallaecian, also called Gallaic or Northwestern Hispano-Celtic, is attested by place names and in a corpus of Latin inscriptions containing isolated words and short sentences with linguistic features that are clearly Celtic. It was spoken in the northwest of the Iberian Peninsula comprising today's Spanish regions of Galicia, the west of Asturias, León and Zamora, and the Portuguese Norte Region, with the Douro as its southern bourndary.

== Use of term ==
The modern term Continental Celtic is used in contrast to Insular Celtic. However, while many researchers agree with the Insular Celtic hypothesis that the Insular Celtic languages constitute a linguistically distinct branch of Celtic (Cowgill 1975; McCone 1991, 1992; Schrijver 1995) that has undergone common linguistic innovations, there is no evidence that the Continental Celtic languages can be similarly grouped. Instead, the group called Continental Celtic is paraphyletic; the term refers simply to non-Insular Celtic languages and not to any special linguistic relationship between them as a group other than they are Celtic. Since little material has been preserved of any of the Continental Celtic languages, historical linguistic analysis based on the comparative method is difficult to perform. However, Gaulish is considered more closely genetically related to the Insular Celtic languages than either of them are to Celtiberian; together, Gaulish and Insular Celtic are key constituents of the Nuclear Celtic family. Meanwhile, under the P/Q hypothesis, other researchers see the Brittonic languages and Gaulish as forming part of a subgroup of the Celtic languages that is known as P-Celtic. Under this hypothesis, Continental languages are P-Celtic except for Celtiberian and Gallaecian, which are Q-Celtic. The Continental Celtic languages have had a definite influence on all of the Romance languages.

== See also ==
- Italo-Celtic

== Bibliography ==
- Ball, M.; Fife, J. (1993). The Celtic Languages. Routledge.
- Cowgill, Warren (1975). "The origins of the Insular Celtic conjunct and absolute verbal endings". In H. Rix (ed.). Flexion und Wortbildung: Akten der V. Fachtagung der Indogermanischen Gesellschaft, Regensburg, 9.–14. September 1973. Wiesbaden: Reichert. pp. 40–70. ISBN 3-920153-40-5.
- Galliou, Patrick; Jones, Michael (1991). The Bretons. Oxford: Blackwell Publishing. ISBN 0-631-16406-5.
- Lambert, Pierre-Yves (1994). La langue gauloise [The Gallic language] (in French). éditions errance. ISBN 978-2877722247.
- McCone, Kim (1991). "The PIE stops and syllabic nasals in Celtic". Studia Celtica Japonica. 4: 37–69.
- McCone, Kim (1992). "Relative Chronologie: Keltisch". In Beekes, R.; Lubotsky, A.; Weitenberg, J. (eds.). Rekonstruktion und relative Chronologie: Akten Der VIII. Fachtagung Der Indogermanischen Gesellschaft, Leiden, 31. August–4. September 1987. Institut für Sprachwissenschaft der Universität Innsbruck. pp. 12–39. ISBN 3-85124-613-6.
- Schrijver, Peter (1995). Studies in British Celtic historical phonology. Amsterdam: Rodopi. ISBN 90-5183-820-4.
- Stifter, David (2008). "Old Celtic 2008 (classroom material)". Archived from the original on 5 July 2008.
