= Nuclear Celtic languages =

Group of Celtic languages spoken outside of Iberia

Nuclear Celtic
- Geographic distribution: Formerly widespread in much of Europe and central Anatolia; today Cornwall, Wales, Scotland, Ireland, Brittany, the Isle of Man, Chubut Province (Y Wladfa), and Nova Scotia
- Linguistic classification: Indo-European: Celtic; Nuclear Celtic
- Subdivisions: Insular Celtic; Gaulish †; Lepontic †; Noric †

Language codes
- Glottolog: nucl1715

The Nuclear Celtic languages, also known as Gallo-Insular Celtic, Gallo-Brythonic–Goidelic, and, ambiguously in terms of the position of Lepontic, North Celtic or Core Celtic, are a group of Celtic languages once spoken across Europe and the British Isles, reaching even Anatolia, but nowadays restricted to the Celtic nations. It consists of all Celtic languages that are not Hispano-Celtic, namely the Insular Celtic languages together with the extinct Gaulish and Lepontic languages.

The Nuclear Celtic languages separated from Hispano-Celtic around 900 BC, possibly due to Phoenician influence causing Hispano-Celtic to drift away from a common Celtic cultural sphere.

== Terminology and internal classification ==
The terms used to refer to the Celtic grouping comprising Gaulish, Goidelic and Brittonic, and also the position of Lepontic in this grouping, vary by author.

=== "Nuclear Celtic" and "Core Celtic" ===
Eska defines Nuclear Celtic as including Gaulish, Lepontic, and the Insular Celtic languages (Goidelic and Brittonic), and furthermore defines Core Celtic as a sub-branch of Nuclear Celtic that excludes Lepontic. On the other hand, Stifter redefines Core Celtic to include Lepontic, making it synonymous to what Eska terms Nuclear Celtic.

Eska's internal taxonomy of Nuclear Celtic is as follows:

- Nuclear Celtic
  - Cisalpine Celtic: Lepontic → Cisalpine Gaulish †
  - Core Celtic
    - "similar to Transalpine Celtic"
      - Transalpine Gaulish † ("Transalpine Celtic")
      - Galatian †
      - Noric †
    - Insular Celtic
      - Goidelic
      - Brittonic

=== "North Celtic" ===
Schrijver defines North Celtic as referring to what Eska calls Core Celtic, namely a grouping of Gaulish and Insular Celtic to the exclusion of Lepontic. He also groups Hispano-Celtic and Lepontic together in a contrasting grouping he calls South Celtic. Schrijver's Celtic taxonomy is as follows:

- Celtic
  - North Celtic
    - Gaulish
    - Insular Celtic
  - South Celtic
    - Celtiberian
    - Lepontic

However, Jørgensen, despite borrowing Schrijver's North Celtic and South Celtic terminology, redefines North Celtic to include Lepontic as well. This redefined North Celtic is thus identical to Eska's Nuclear Celtic. Jørgensen's redefinition of North Celtic is as follows:

- North Celtic
  - Lepontic †
  - (of uncertain further subgrouping)
    - Gaulish
    - Goidelic
    - Brittonic

=== Other terms ===
Gallo-Insular Celtic and Gallo-Brythonic–Goidelic are terms coined, respectively, by Kim McCone (who supports an Insular Celtic clade) and John T. Koch (who follows a Gallo-Brythonic hypothesis). Gallo-Insular Celtic's family tree is defined by McCone as follows:

- Gallo-Insular Celtic
  - Gaulish (also including Lepontic)
  - Insular Celtic
    - Goidelic ("Irish")
    - Brittonic ("British")

== Common characteristics ==
Common characteristics of the Nuclear Celtic branch (and the Core Celtic sub-branch as defined by Eska) include:

- *st becoming a phoneme known as tau gallicum, which was notated variously in Gaulish but merged with -ss- in Goidelic. In contrast, Hispano-Celtic preserved *st as is.
- Complete monophthongization of the diphthong *ei to /eː/ in non-final position.
- Refashioning of the (preserved in Hispano-Celtic) inflected relative pronoun *yos (feminine *yā) into an uninflected relative particle *yo.
- Spread of the o-stem genitive singular *-ī, completely absent in Hispano-Celtic.
- A genitive plural *-om, contrasting with its Hispano-Celtic counterpart -um. Eska believes that *-om is a shared innovation of Nuclear Celtic with Hispano-Celtic preserving an older ending. However, Prósper believes the reverse was the case, with Hispano-Celtic innovating -um (and even there, -om was retained in some dialects); -om elsewhere would be a retention.
- The repurposing of *to, originally a connecting particle, into a preverb *to-; such a preverb appears in Cisalpine Gaulish and Insular Celtic.
- The rise of a characteristic verb complex, including the ability to affix multiple preverbs to a verb simultaneously; both Gaulish and early Insular Celtic allow double prefixation of verbs.

== Works cited ==
- Eska, Joseph (2017). "The dialectology of Celtic". In Jared Klein; Brian Joseph; Matthias Fritz (eds.). Handbook of Comparative and Historical Indo-European Linguistics. Berlin: De Gruyter Mouton. pp. 1264–1274.
- Jørgensen, Anders Richardt (2022). "Celtic". The Indo-European Language Family. Cambridge University Press. pp. 135–151. doi:10.1017/9781108758666.009. ISBN 978-1-108-75866-6.
- Koch, John T. (2020). Celto-Germanic: Later Prehistory and Post-Proto-Indo-European vocabulary in the North and West. Aberystwyth: University of Wales Centre for Advanced Welsh and Celtic Studies.
- McCone, Kim (2006). The Origins and Development of the Insular Celtic Verbal Complex. Maynooth studies in Celtic linguistics. Department of Old Irish, National University of Ireland. ISBN 978-0-901519-46-7.
- Prósper, Blanca María (2024). "The Inscriptions of Todi (Umbria) and Vergiate (Transpadana): A Study in Cisalpine Celtic Epigraphic Habits, Noun Morphology, and the Linguistic Classification of Lepontic". In David M. Goldstein; Stephanie W. Jamison; Anthony D. Yates (eds.). Proceedings of the 34th Annual UCLA Indo-European Conference: Los Angeles, October 27th and 28th, 2023. pp. 215–250.
- Schrijver, Peter (2015). "Pruners and trainers of the Celtic family tree: The rise and development of Celtic in the light of language contact". In Liam Breatnach (ed.). Proceedings of the XIV International Congress of Celtic Studies. Dublin: Dublin Institute of Advanced Studies. pp. 191–219.
- Stifter, David (2023). "With the Back to the Ocean: The Celtic Maritime Vocabulary". In Kristian Kristiansen; Guus Kroonen; Eske Willerslev (eds.). The Indo-European Puzzle Revisited Integrating Archaeology, Genetics, and Linguistics. Cambridge University Press.
