= Lepontii =

Ancient Celtic people of the Alps

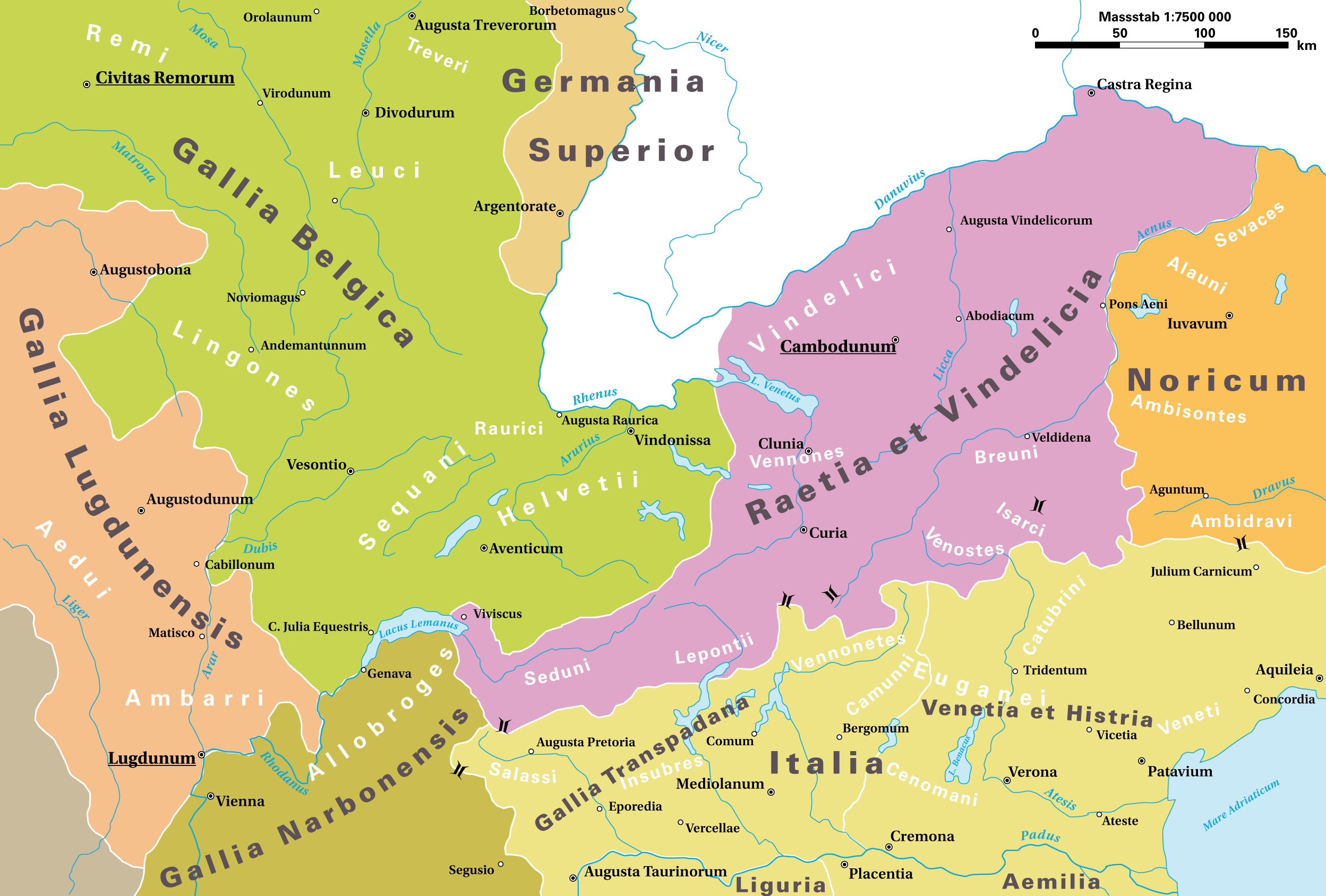
Map of the Alpine provinces as of AD 14, showing the position of the Lepontii within Rhaetia and north of Gallia Transpadana

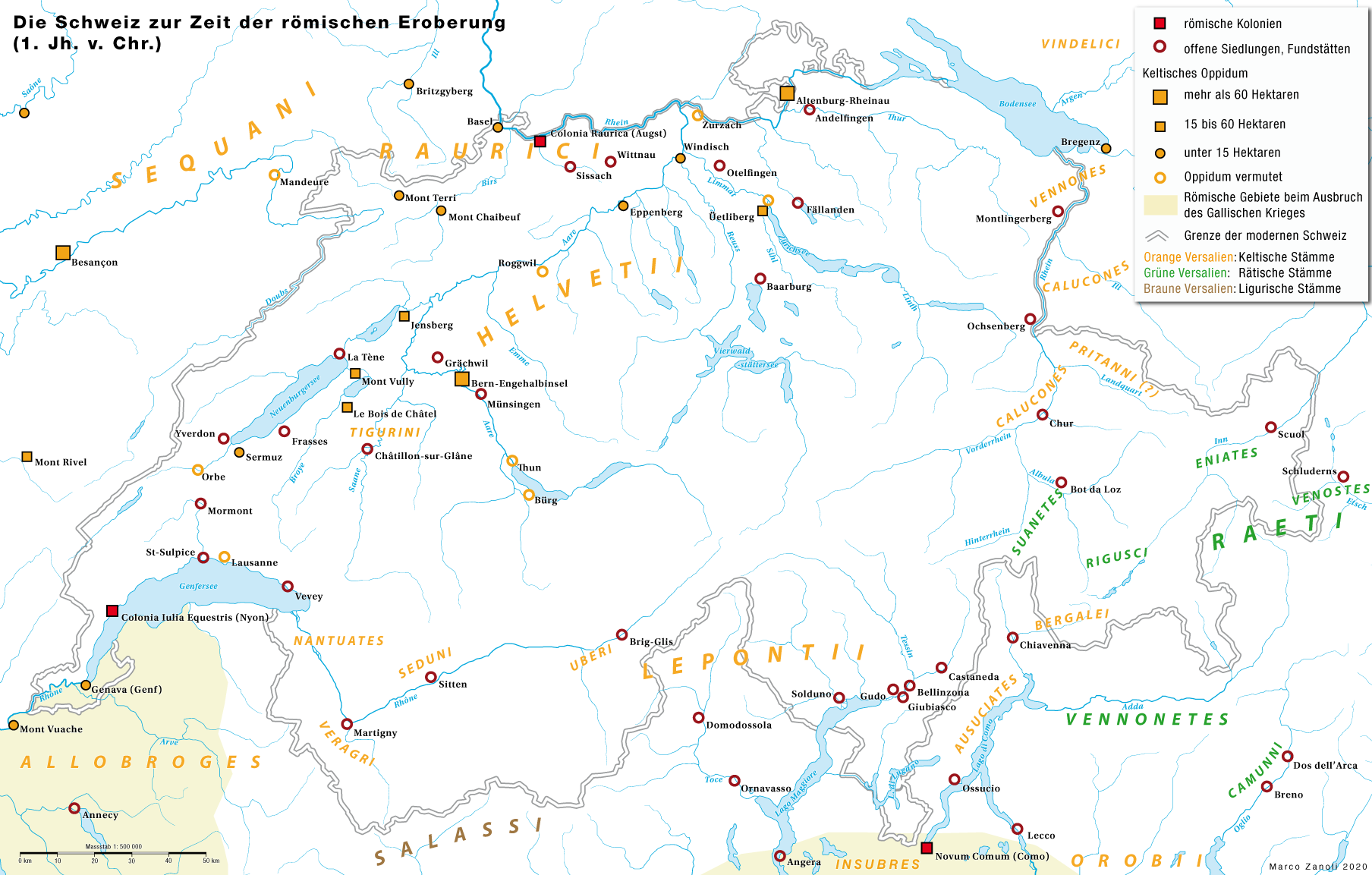
Celtic (orange) and Rhaetic (green) settlements in Switzerland

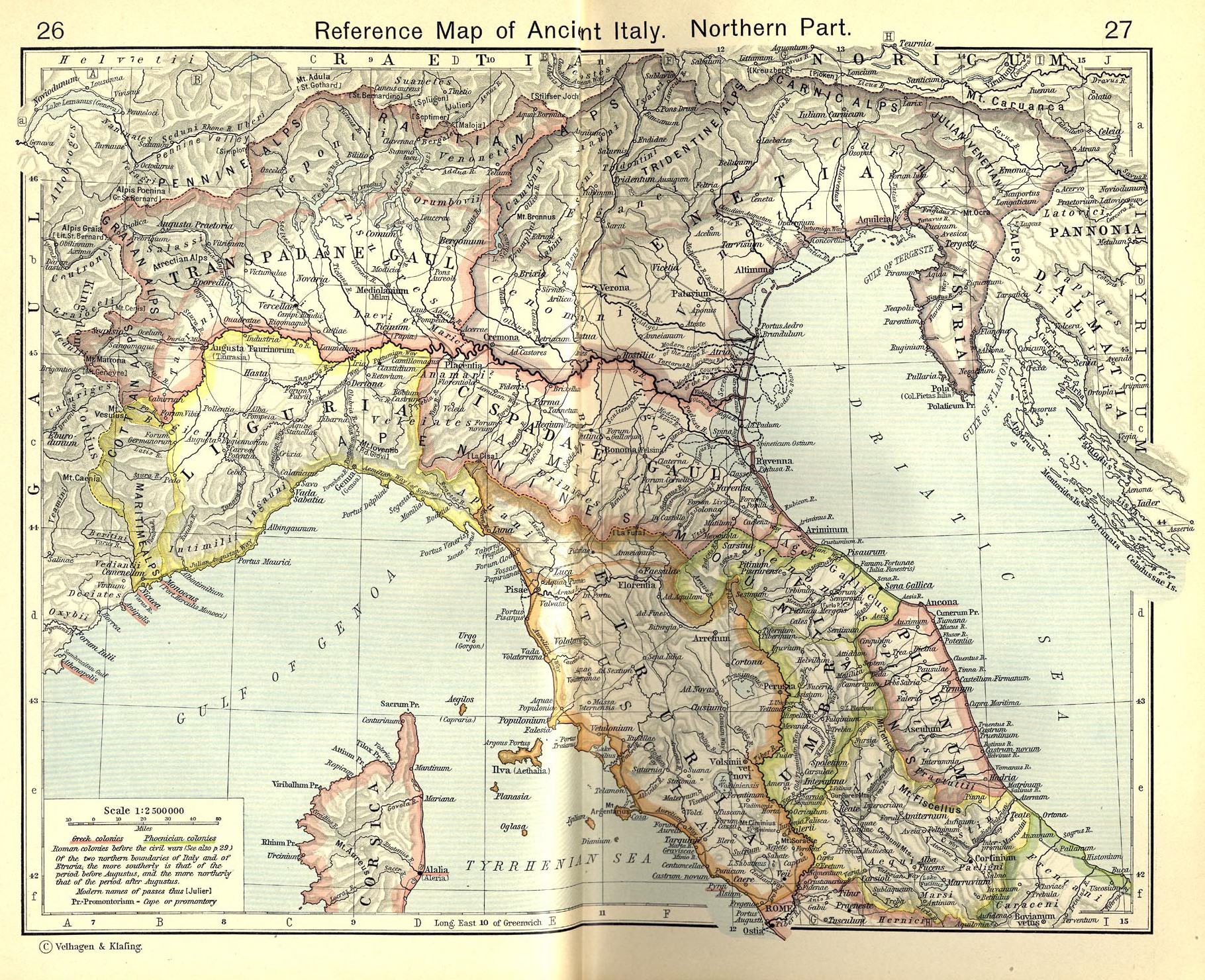
Central and northern Italy according to the Historical Atlas, showing the Lepontii in the northern area of Gallia Transpadana.

The Lepontii (also Leponti or Lepontini) were an ancient Celtic or celticized people or tribe settled during the Iron Age occupying portions of Rhaetia, in the central and western Alps, between modern Switzerland and north-western Italy during the late Bronze Age/Iron Age.

According to ancient authors, their territory extended northward to the sources of the Rhône and the Rhine, and southward to the areas where the Alpine valleys open toward the Po Valley, thus including the Canton of Ticino, western Lombardy, and the Ossola Valley. Their existence is attested from the 1st millennium BC.

The main settlement of the Lepontii was called Oscela, which the Romans later renamed Oscela Lepontiorum; today the town of Domodossola, in Italy. Another important centre or town was Bilitio, the present-day Bellinzona, in Switzerland. Their territory included the southern slopes of the St. Gotthard Pass and Simplon Pass, corresponding roughly to present-day Ossola, Italy; and Ticino, Switzerland.

Recent archeological excavations and their association with the Golasecca culture (9th–7th centuries BC) and Canegrate culture (13th century BC) point to a Celtic affiliation. From the analysis of their language and the place names of the old Lepontic areas, it was hypothesized that these people represent a layer similar to that Celtic but previous to the Gallic penetration in the Po valley. The suggestion has been made that the Lepontii may have been celticized Ligurians.

A map of Rhaetia shows the location of the Lepontic territory, in the south-western corner of Rhaetia. The area to the south, including what was to become the Insubrian capital Mediolanum (modern Milan), was Etruscan around 600–500 BCE, when the Lepontii began writing tombstone inscriptions in their alphabet, one of several Etruscan-derived alphabets in the Rhaetian territory.

== Etymology ==
Their name derives from the Latin Lepontii and appears in Ancient Greek as Lēpontiī (Ληπόντιοι).

== History ==
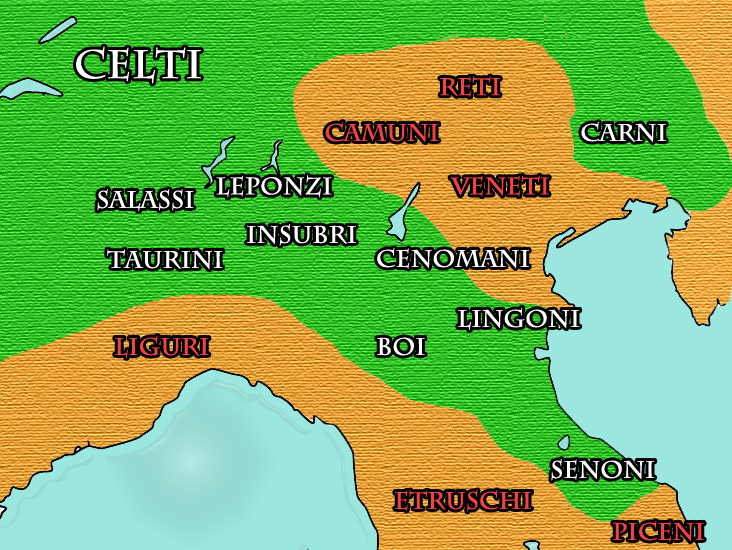
The peoples of Cisalpine Gaul.

=== Origins and classical sources ===
In the writings of ancient authors, descriptions of the origins of the Lepontii mix legends and contradictory accounts. According to Pliny the Elder, the Lepontii were companions of Hercules who, while crossing the Alps, lost the use of their legs and were therefore abandoned. According to Polybius and Cato the Elder, their origin was Ligurian, while Strabo (c. 58 BC–AD 25) considered them similar to the Camunni and therefore one of the communities into which the Rhaetians were divided.

The Rhaeti extend over the part of Italy that lies above Verona and Como. The Rhaetian wine, reputed not to be inferior to the renowned wines of Italy, grows on the slopes of their mountains. Their territory also stretches to the lands through which the Rhine flows; and to this tribe belong the Lepontii and the Camunni.

— Strabo, Geography, IV, 6.8, Οἱ μὲν οὖν Ῥαιτοὶ μέχρι τῆς Ἰταλίας καθήκουσι τῆς ὑπὲρ Οὐήρωνος καὶ Κώμου. Καὶ ὅ γε Ῥαιτικὸς οἶνος, τῶν ἐν τοῖς Ἰταλικοῖς ἐπαινουμένων οὐκ ἀπολείπεσθαι δοκῶν, ἐν ταῖς τούτων ὑπωρείαις γίνεται· διατείνουσι δὲ καὶ μέχρι τῶν χωρίων, δι' ὧν ὁ Ῥῆνος φέρεται· τούτου δ' εἰσὶ τοῦ φύλου καὶ Ληπόντιοι καὶ Καμοῦνοι.

Modern historians tend to give greater credit to Polybius and Cato, while also noting significant Celtic infiltration that modified the Ligurian substratum.

The Lepontii were part of the context of the Golasecca culture (between the 9th and 7th centuries BC), itself derived from the Canegrate culture (13th century BC). From the analysis of their language and the ancient toponymy of the Lepontian areas, it has been hypothesised that this people represented a layer related to the Celtic world but predating the Gallic penetration into the Po Valley.

Important indications about the history of the Lepontii come from the discoveries in the Ornavasso necropolis. Agricultural tools and the richness of the grave goods (including silver and bronze vessels) found in the tombs of the earliest phase of the San Bernardo necropolis testify to a population mainly devoted to agriculture and pastoralism but also enjoying a notable degree of prosperity. These artefacts date to the period between the 2nd and 1st centuries BC, when Roman power had not yet conquered the Cisalpine populations, although good relations were necessary for access to the Alpine passes. It has been hypothesised that they may have charged tolls for passage through the valley, and it is not excluded that they also carried out raids into more southern territories.

The exact date of their subjugation to Rome is unknown, but it probably occurred between the conquest of the Salassi (24 BC) and that of the Valtellina (15 BC). The Lepontii are mentioned in the Tropaeum Alpium erected between 7 and 6 BC.

=== Roman conquest ===
The name of the Lepontii is recorded in the Tropaeum Alpium, a Roman monument erected in 7–6 BC to celebrate the submission of the Alpine peoples and located near the French town of La Turbie:

Alpine peoples subdued: [...] · Suaneti · Caluconi · Brixeneti · Lepontii [...].

— Tropaeum Alpium, Front inscription, GENTES ALPINAE DEVICTAE [...]· SUANETES · CALUCONES · BRIXENETES · LEPONTI [...].

== Language ==
Numerous inscriptions have been discovered in a language known as Lepontic (sometimes referred to less correctly as Lepontic following the English term), dating to the 7th century BC. The Lepontic language was classified by Michel Lejeune as a Continental Celtic language, and this classification still enjoys the widest acceptance among scholars. A minority of linguists instead follow the more recent classification proposed by Joseph Eska, according to which Lepontic would represent an early form of Gaulish.

== See also ==
- Lepontic language
- Canegrate culture
- Celts in the Alps and Po Valley
- Cisalpine Gaulish
- Golasecca culture
- Ancient peoples of Italy
- Scamozzina culture
- Rhaetians

== Bibliography ==
=== Primary sources ===
- Strabo, Geography
- Tropaeum Alpium

=== Historical literature ===
- Vittore Pisani, Le lingue dell'Italia antica oltre il latino, 2nd ed., Turin, Rosenberg & Sellier, 1964. ISBN 88-7011-024-9. (in Italian)
- Maria Grazia Tibiletti Bruno, "Ligure, leponzio e gallico", pp. 129–208, in Lingue e dialetti dell'Italia antica, edited by Aldo Luigi Prosdocimi, Rome, Biblioteca di Storia Patria, 1978. (in Italian)
- Robert Seymour Conway; Joshua Whatmough; Sarah Elizabeth Johnson, The Raetic, Lepontic, Gallic, East-Italic, Messapic and Sicel Inscriptions, in The Prae-Italic Dialects of Italy, vol. 2, Cambridge, Harvard University Press, 1933.
- Piana Agostinetti, Paola (1972). Documenti per la protostoria della Val d'Ossola. Varese: Cisalpino-Goliardica. (in Italian)
- R. C. De Marinis; S. Biaggio Simona (eds.), I Leponti tra mito e realtà, Locarno, Dadò, 2000. (in Italian)
- Tibiletti Bruno, M. G. (1978). "Ligure, leponzio e gallico". In Popoli e civiltà dell'Italia antica vi, Lingue e dialetti, ed. A. L. Prosdocimi, 129–208. Rome: Biblioteca di Storia Patria.
- Tibiletti Bruno, M. G. (1981). "Le iscrizioni celtiche d'Italia". In I Celti d'Italia, ed. E. Campanile, 157–207. Pisa: Giardini.
- ULRICH-BANSA O.1957, Monete rinvenute nelle necropoli di Ornavasso, in “Rivista Italiana di Numismatica”, LIX, pp. 6–69.
- Whatmough, J. (1933). The Prae-Italic Dialects of Italy, vol. 2, The Raetic, Lepontic, Gallic, East-Italic, Messapic and Sicel Inscriptions. Cambridge, Massachusetts: Harvard University Press.
- AA.VV. and Prosdocimi, A.L. (1991). I Celti, pag.50-60, Lingua e scrittura dei primi Celti. Bompiani.
- AA.VV. and De Marinis, R.C. (1991). I Celti, capìtol I Celti Golasecchiani. Bompiani.
- Stifter, D. 2020. Cisalpine Celtic. Language, Writing, Epigraphy. Aelaw Booklet 8. Zaragoza: Prensas de la Universidad de Zaragoza.
- Stifter, D. 2020. «Cisalpine Celtic», Palaeohispanica 20: 335–365.
