= Celtic inscriptions in Noricum =

Late Antiquity inscriptions

Two inscriptions in Grafenstein, Carinthia, Austria and Ptuj, Slovenia, are written in a Celtic language referred to as Noric, potentially spoken in the Roman province of Noricum in early centuries AD. Due to the lack of sources the existence of a separate language is uncertain.

== Ptuj inscription ==
ARTEBUDZBROGDUI (a facsimile of the original inscription, written right to left)

The Ptuj inscription, discovered in 1894, is written right to left in Old Italic alphabet, and is unusual, since the vernacular writing traditions of Northern Italy are considered to have ceased in the late first century BC. The inscription reads as follows:

𐌀𐌓𐌕𐌄𐌁𐌖𐌈𐌆𐌁𐌓𐌏𐌙𐌈𐌖𐌉

Translation:

ARTEBUDZBROGDUI

This is interpreted as two personal names: Artebudz [son] of Brogduos. The name Artebudz may mean "bear penis" (compare Welsh arth "bear" and Irish bod "penis"), while Brogduos may contain the element brog-, mrog- "country" (compare Welsh bro "region, country"). Alternatively, the inscription may be interpreted as Artebudz [made this] for Brogdos, with the second name in the dative case.

== Grafenstein inscription ==
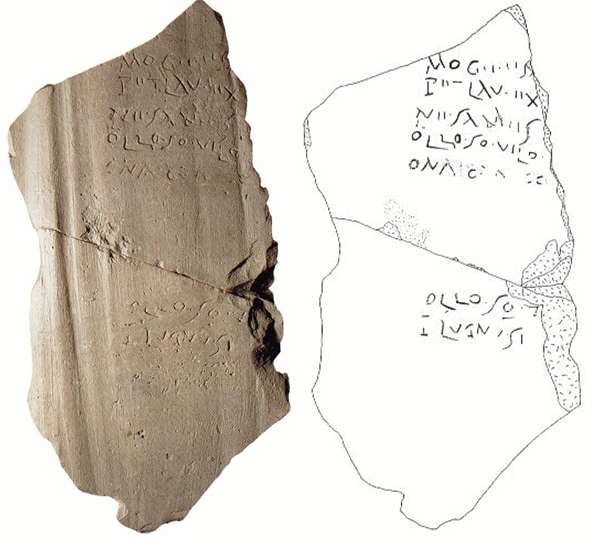
The Grafenstein inscription

The Grafenstein inscription, on a tile from the 2nd century AD that was discovered in a gravel pit in 1977, is incomplete, but the extant part has been transcribed as follows:

MOGE · ES[

P· II- LAV · EX[
ṆE · SAḌỊÍES[
OLLO · SO · VILO[
ỌNẠ C[…]

OLLO · SO · ? [

P LṾGNṾ · SI

Here, Moge seems to be a personal name or an abbreviation of one, P· II- lav a Latin abbreviation indicating a weight, ne sadiíes a verbal form possibly meaning "you (singular) do not set", ollo so perhaps "this amount", and Lugnu another personal name. The text may therefore be a record of some sort of financial transaction.

Other readings of the inscription have also been proposed, including:

MOGE · ES+[---]

PET(?) LAV · EX[---]
NE · SAMES[---]
OLLO · SO · VILO ·[---]
ONA O(?) + ++

OLLO · SO ·+

+ LVGNI · SI

and

MOGV · CISS [---

PETILAV · IEX[---
NE · SADIIES[---
OLLO · SO · VILO ·[---
ONA DOM...OC[

OLLO · SO · VIA .[

ILVGNV.SI[

== Language ==
Noric
- (uncertain)
- Native to: Austria, Slovenia
- Ethnicity: Taurisci
- Era: attested 2nd century AD
- Language family: Indo-European: Celtic; Nuclear Celtic?/Continental Celtic?; Noric
- Writing system: Old Italic

Language codes
- ISO 639-3: nrc
- Glottolog: nori1240

The proposed language in which these inscriptions are written is referred to as Noric or Eastern Celtic, likely a Continental Celtic language; no further evidence or proofs of its existence are found. No evidence yet shows when it became extinct; inscriptions are dated to the second or third century AD. The language was spoken across Austria and Slovenia, but is sometimes considered to have a bigger linguistic area, stretching as far as modern Serbia and Czechia.
