= San Gaudenzio, Ivrea =

Roman Catholic church in Ivrea, Italy

San Gaudenzio
- Chiesa di San Gaudenzio (Italian)
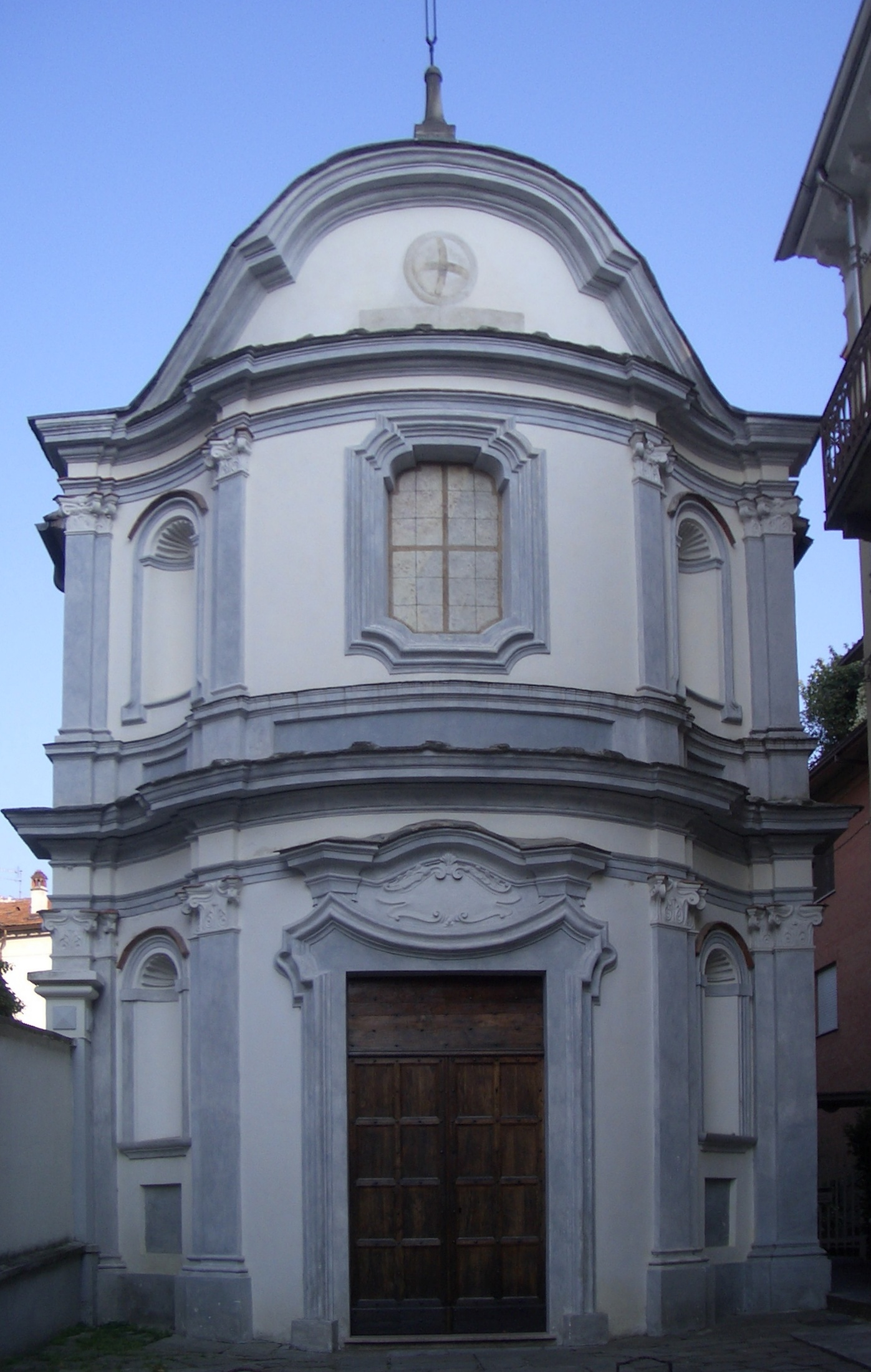
- Façade
- Click on the map for a fullscreen view
- 45.46215°N 7.87385°E
- Country: Italy
- Denomination: Roman Catholic

Architecture
- Functional status: Active
- Style: Baroque architecture

Administration
- Archdiocese: Diocese of Ivrea

San Gaudenzio is a Baroque architecture, Roman Catholic church located on Via San Gaudenzio in the town of Ivrea, Province of Turin, region of Piedmont, Italy.

== History ==
Tradition holds that the church is located on a site where St Gaudentius in the year 348 had lain down on a rock overnight, and his body miraculously left an imprint on the rock. The church was constructed between 1716 and 1724 at the site of a former castle. The bell tower was built in 1742. The architect remains unknown, although the rococo design of the facade with a convex front and an oval tympanum appears influenced by Bernardo Antonio Vittone. Some attribute the design to Luigi Andrea Guibert, active in Ivrea, between 1714 and 1719. The interior contains frescoes (1738–1739) by Luca Rossetti.

The church has a number of paintings depicting the scenes in the Life of St Gaudentius, including a Glory of the Saint in the apse, behind the main altar. One is a procession leaving the chiesa di San Gaudenzio with the city in the background.

== Gallery ==
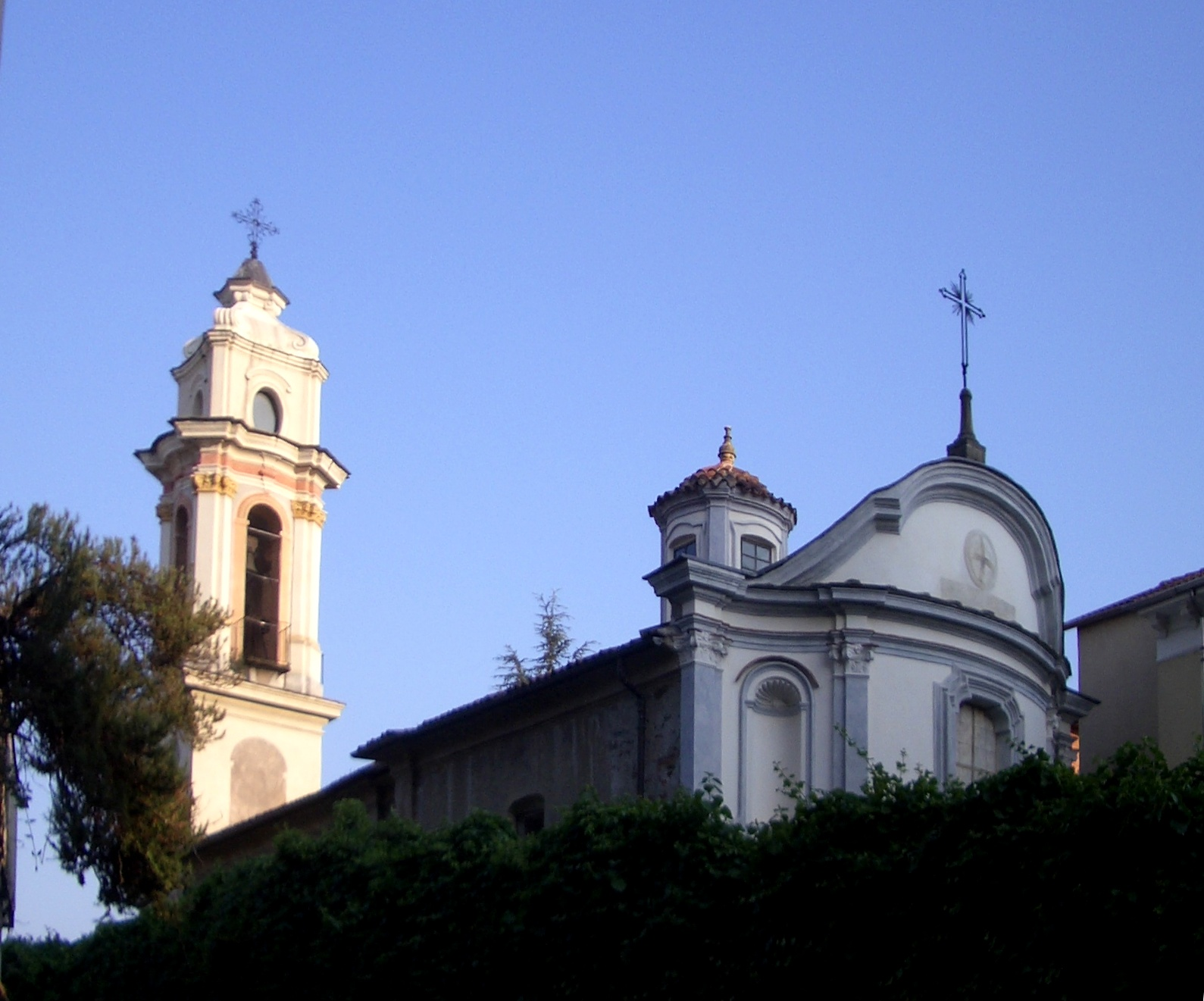
Bell-tower

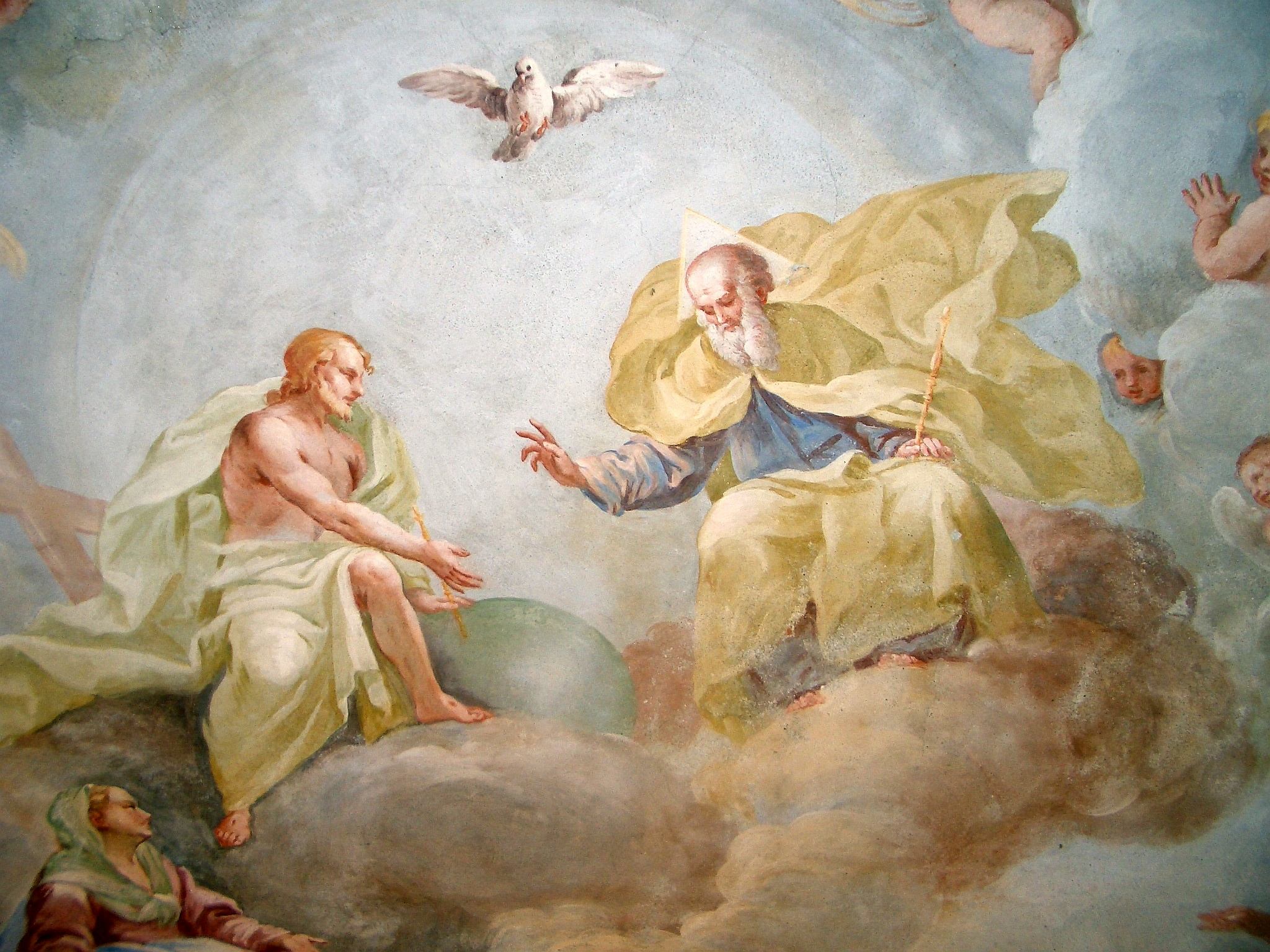
Holy Trinity by Luca Rossetti

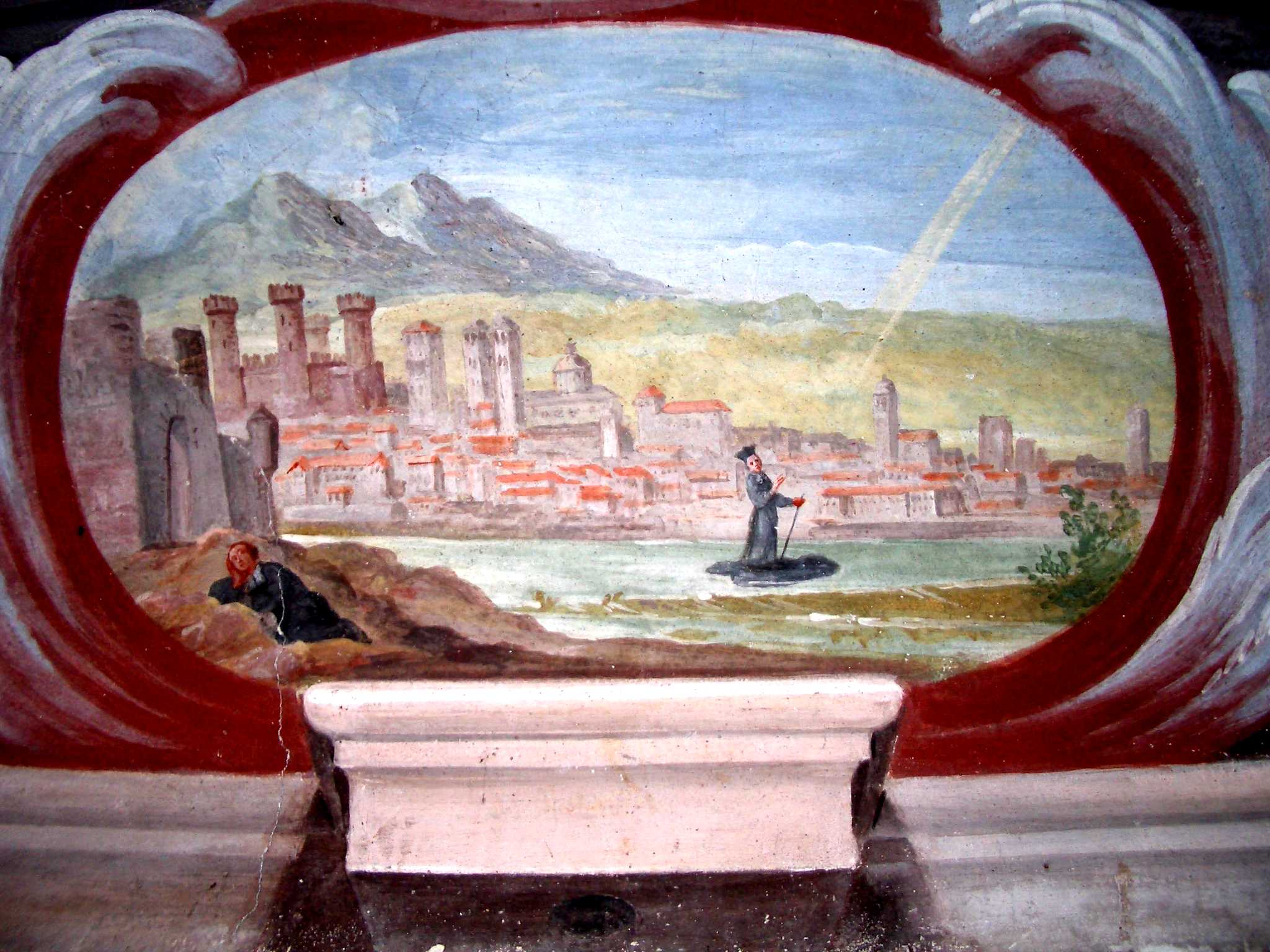
Frescoes
