= Miasino =

- Comune
- Comune di Miasino
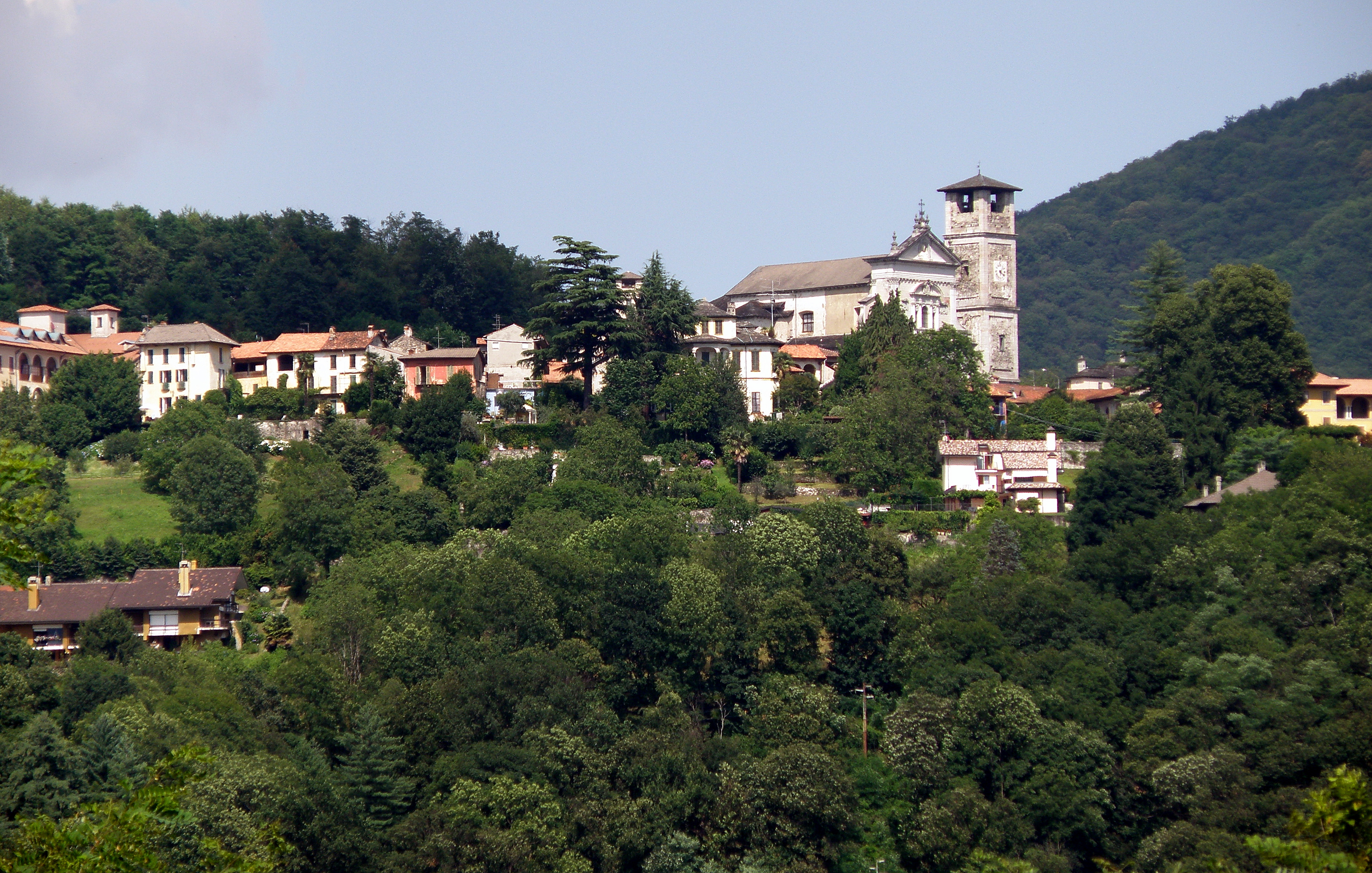
- View of Miasino

- Location within Italy Location within Piedmont
- Coordinates: 45°48′N 8°26′E
- Country: Italy
- Region: Piedmont
- Province: Province of Novara (NO)
- Frazioni: Pisogno, Carcegna

Area
  - Total: 5.3 km^{2} (2.0 sq mi)

Population (Dec. 2004)
  - Total: 950
  - Density: 180/km^{2} (460/sq mi)
- Time zone: UTC+1 (CET)
  - Summer (DST): UTC+2 (CEST)
- Postal code: 28010
- Dialing code: 0322
- Website: Comune di Masino

Miasino is a comune (municipality) in the Province of Novara in the Italian region of Piedmont, located about 100 kilometres (62 mi) northeast of Turin and about 40 kilometres (25 mi) northwest of Novara. As of 31 December 2004, it had a population of 950 and an area of 5.3 square kilometres (2.0 mi^{2}).

The municipality of Miasino contains the frazioni (subdivisions, mainly villages and hamlets) Pisogno, Tortirogno and Carcegna.

Miasino borders the following municipalities: Ameno, Armeno, Orta San Giulio, and Pettenasco.

== Curiosity ==
In the Castle of Miasino was filmed the thriller movie A Thorn in the Heart (original title Una spina nel cuore) (1986) by Alberto Lattuada. (Info by the Dizionario del Turismo Cinematografico)

== Demographic evolution ==
Historical population

Year	Pop.	±%
1861	1,166	—
1871	1,213	+4.0%
1881	1,201	−1.0%
1901	1,283	+6.8%
1911	1,163	−9.4%

Year	Pop.	±%
1921	1,120	−3.7%
1931	1,000	−10.7%
1936	934	−6.6%
1951	1,003	+7.4%
1961	1,006	+0.3%

Year	Pop.	±%
1971	893	−11.2%
1981	906	+1.5%
1991	932	+2.9%
2001	953	+2.3%

Source: Data from ISTAT
