= Italo-Celtic languages =

Hypothetical grouping of the Italic and Celtic language families

Italo-Celtic
- (proposed)
- Linguistic classification: Indo-European: Italo-Celtic
- Proto-language: Proto-Italo-Celtic
- Subdivisions: Italic; Celtic; ?Ligurian † (disputed); ?Lusitanian † (disputed); ?Venetic † (disputed)

Language codes
- Glottolog: None
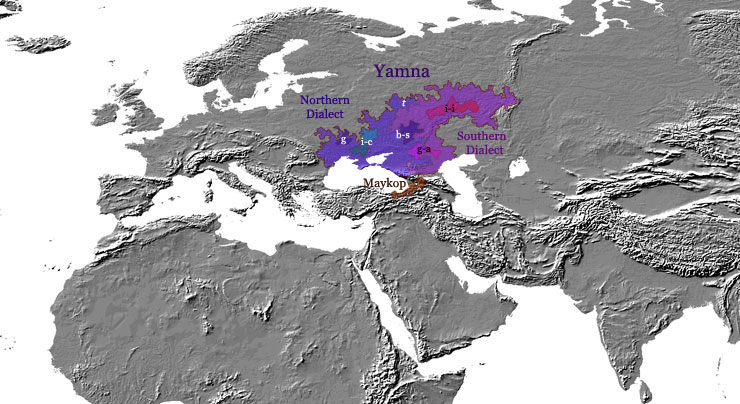
- Italo-Celtic (I-C) homeland north of the Black Sea, according to one interpretation of the theory.

In historical linguistics, Italo-Celtic or Celto-Italic is a hypothetical grouping of the Italic and Celtic branches of the Indo-European language family on the basis of features shared by these two branches and no others. There is controversy about the causes of these similarities. They are usually considered to be innovations, likely to have developed after the breakup of the Proto-Indo-European language. It is also possible that some of these are not innovations, but shared conservative features, i.e. original Indo-European language features which have disappeared in all other language groups. What is commonly accepted is that the shared features may usefully be thought of as Italo-Celtic forms, as they are certainly shared by the two families and are almost certainly not coincidental.

== Interpretations ==
The traditional interpretation of the data is that both sub-groups of the Indo-European language family are generally more closely related to each other than to the other Indo-European languages. The hypothesis, supported by shared phonological, morphological, and syntactic innovations, proposes that the Italic and Celtic languages share a common linguistic ancestor within the Indo-European family, Proto-Italo-Celtic, which can be partially reconstructed using the comparative method.

The idea of an Italo-Celtic linguistic unity was first proposed in 1861 by Carl Lottner in a study published in the journal Kuhn-Schleichlers Beiträge. Over the following three-quarters of a century, the hypothesis gained considerable support, largely thanks to Antoine Meillet, one of the most influential Indo-European linguists of his time. In 1929, Carl Marstrander challenged the theory in a critical discussion. That hypothesis fell out of favour after it was re-examined by Calvert Watkins in 1966.

Nevertheless, other scholars, continued to be interested in the theory. Warren Cowgill (1970) not only argued for this linguistic unity but also proposed a plausible migration theory to explain it. His theoretical model posited an extreme western Italo-Celtic group whose members spoke a very late form of Proto-Indo-European, characterized by only a limited set of basic developments, such as the loss of laryngeals, alongside a distinct set of shared innovations. Frederik Kortlandt, examined how sequences involving vowels, laryngeals and syllabic resonants developed in Italic and Celtic. His argument built on earlier work by Soviet linguists Vladimir Dybo and Vladislav Illich-Svitych and attempted to explain a number of apparent irregularities through a coherent relative chronology of sound changes.

In 2002 a paper by Ringe, Warnow and Taylor, employing computational methods as a supplement to the traditional linguistic subgrouping methodology, argued in favour of an Italo-Celtic subgroup, and in 2007, Kortlandt attempted a reconstruction of a Proto-Italo-Celtic. Emphatic support for an Italo-Celtic clade came from Celtologist Peter Schrijver in 1991. More recently, Schrijver (2016) has argued that Celtic arose in or close to northern Italy as the first branch of Italo-Celtic to split off, with areal affinities to Venetic and Sabellian, and identified Proto-Celtic archaeologically with the Canegrate culture of the Late Bronze Age of Italy (c. 1300–1100 BC).

The most common alternative interpretation is that the proximity of Proto-Celtic and Proto-Italic over a long period could have encouraged the parallel development of what were already quite separate languages, as areal features within a Sprachbund. As Watkins (1966) puts it, "the community of -ī in Italic and Celtic is attributable to early contact, rather than to an original unity". The assumed period of language contact could then be later and perhaps continue well into the first millennium BC.

However, if some of the forms are archaic elements of Proto-Indo-European that were lost in other branches, neither model of post-PIE relationship must be postulated. Italic and especially Celtic also share several distinctive features with the Hittite language (an Anatolian language) and the Tocharian languages, and those features are certainly archaisms.

== Archaeology ==
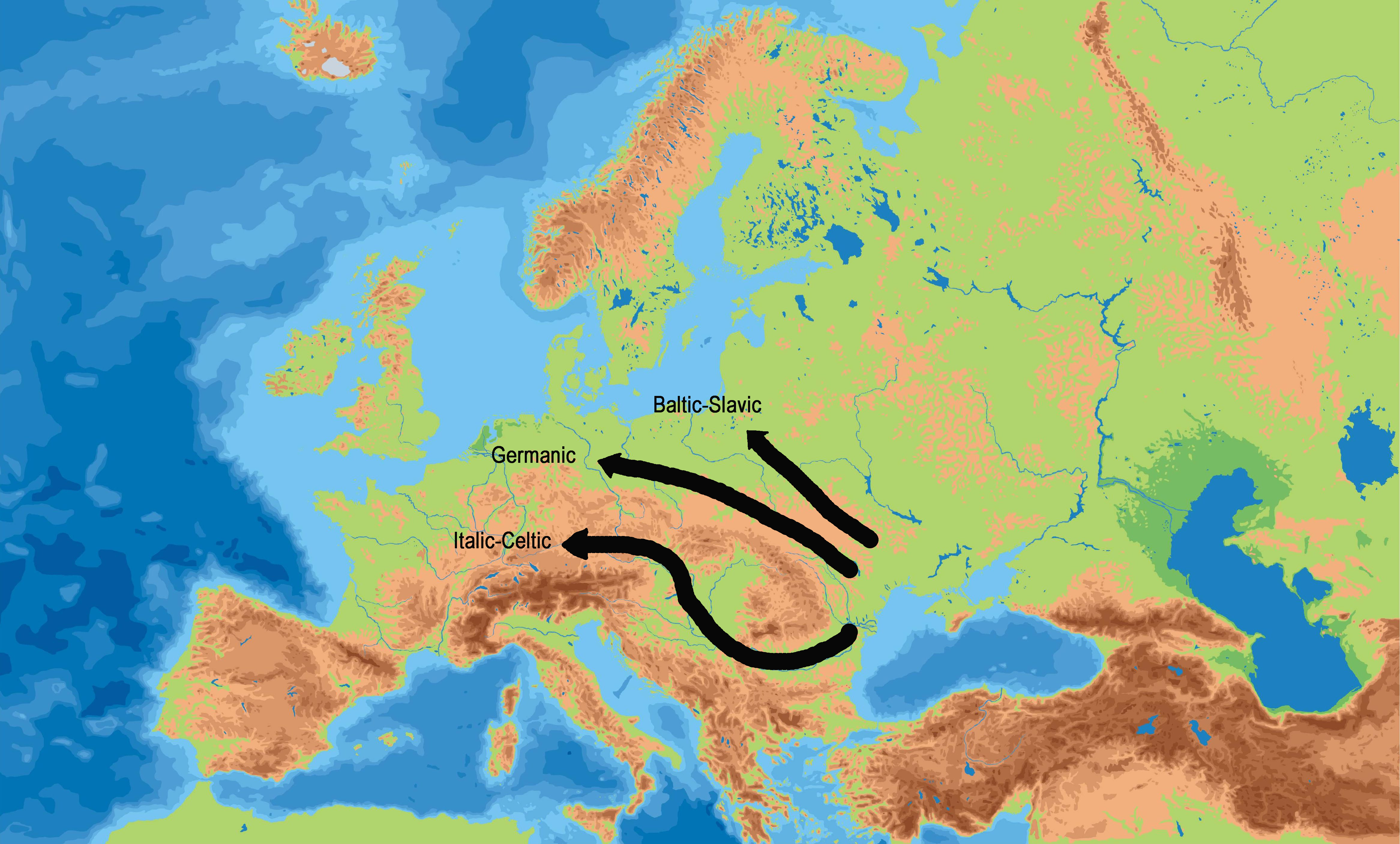
IE migrations north and south of the Carpathian Mountains, and the subsequent development of Celtic, Germanic, and Balto-Slavic, according to Anthony (2007)

Scholars that regard Proto-Italo-Celtic as an identifiable historical language estimate that it was spoken during the 3rd or 2nd millennium BC somewhere in Central Europe, perhaps within the context of the Bell Beaker culture. In particular, the reconstructed Proto-Italo-Celtic vocabulary is compatible with a Bronze Age farming and pastoral economy, familiar with plough agriculture, cereal cultivation, horses, sheep and cattle.

David W. Anthony, in his work "The Horse, The Wheel and Language," hypothesized that the expansion of populations associated with the Yamnaya culture into the Danube basin may have differentiated both proto-Italic and proto-Celtic languages from early Indo-European dialects. The Bell Beaker phenomenon could have been the link which brought the Yamnaya dialects from Hungary to Austria and Bavaria. These dialects probably later developed into Proto-Celtic. Proto-Italic could have developed among the dialects that remained in Hungary, ultimately spreading into Italy through the Urnfield and proto-Villanovan cultures.

== Forms ==
The principal Italo-Celtic forms are:

- the thematic genitive singular in ī (e.g. Latin second declension dominus, gen.sg. dominī). Both in Italic (Popliosio Valesiosio, Lapis Satricanus) and in Celtic (Lepontic -oiso, Celtiberian -o), traces of the -osyo genitive of Proto-Indo-European (PIE) have also been discovered, which might indicate that the spread of the ī genitive occurred in the two groups independently (or by areal diffusion). The ī genitive has been compared to the so-called Cvi formation in Sanskrit, but that too is probably a comparatively late development. The phenomenon is probably related to the feminine long ī stems and the Luwian i-mutation.
- the formation of superlatives with reflexes of the PIE suffix *-ism̥mo- (Latin fortis, fortissimus "strong, strongest", Old Irish sen, sinem "old, oldest", Oscan mais, maimas "more, most"), where branches outside Italic and Celtic derive superlatives with reflexes of PIE *-isto- instead (Sanskrit: urús, váriṣṭhas "broad, broadest", Ancient Greek: καλός, κάλλιστος "beautiful, fairest", Old Norse rauðr, rauðastr "red, reddest", as well as English "-est").
- the ā-subjunctive. Both Italic and Celtic have a subjunctive descended from an earlier optative in -ā-. Such an optative is not known from other languages, but the suffix occurs in Balto-Slavic and Tocharian past tense formations, and possibly in Hittite -ahh-.
- the collapsing of the PIE aorist and perfect into a single past tense. In both groups, this is a relatively late development of the proto-languages, possibly dating to the time of Italo-Celtic language contact.

A number of other similarities continue to be pointed out and debated.

- The r-passive (mediopassive voice) was initially thought to be an innovation restricted to Italo-Celtic until it was found to be a retained archaism shared with Hittite, Tocharian, and possibly the Phrygian language.
- Development of *CRHC sequences to *CRāC. Though this particular development is shared between Italic and Celtic, both language families also show divergent treatments of *CRHC clusters in other situations. For instance, Italic may showcase a development of *CŔ̥HC to *CaRC or *CaRaC, a development known as the palma-rule. Likewise, Celtic occasionally showcases a development of *CRHC to *CRaC, as in Old Irish flaith ("lordship, sovereignty, rule"), which reflects PIE *wl̥Hti-. According to the philologist Michael Weiss, these differing sound changes imply the resolution of *CRHC sequences must not be a common Italo-Celtic development.
- The assimilation of *p to a following *kʷ; this development obviously predates the Celtic loss of *p:
  - PIE *pekʷ- 'cook' → Latin coquere; Welsh pobi (Welsh p is from Proto-Celtic *kʷ)
  - PIE *penkʷe 'five' → Latin quīnque; Old Irish cóic, Welsh pump, Oscan pompe, Umbrian pumpe
  - PIE *perkʷu- 'oak' → Latin quercus; Goidelic ethnonym Querni, in northwest Hispania Querquerni

However, the development of PIE perkʷu- to Latin quercus (< PIt. *kʷerkʷus) appears to show that the Italic assimilation of *p to *kʷ precedes the development of *kʷu to *ku. However, the Celtic term Hercynia (< *perkunia) appears to showcase the opposite; it requires that the change of *kʷu to *ku occur prior to the assimilation, thus allowing the initial *p to remain, which was eventually regularly lost as part of a later Celtic sound change. Alternatively, it is possible that the dissimilation of *kʷu to *ku was already a PIE development, in which case Italic must have regularly undergone the assimilation in the oblique cases (i.e. gen.sg. *pr̥kʷéw-), which then spread analogically to the other case forms. If this theory is accepted, then this particular lexical item provides no information regarding the relative chronology of these sound changes.
