= Lepontic language =

Ancient Celtic language

Lepontic
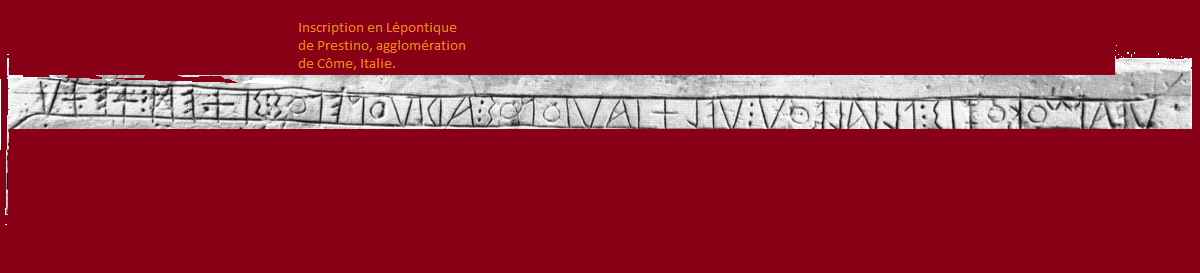
- Lepontic inscription from Prestino (Como, Italy)
- Region: Cisalpine Gaul
- Ethnicity: Lepontii
- Era: attested 550–100 BC
- Language family: Indo-European: Celtic; Nuclear Celtic/Continental Celtic; Lepontic
- Writing system: Lugano alphabet (a variant of Old Italic)

Language codes
- ISO 639-3: xlp
- Glottolog: lepo1240
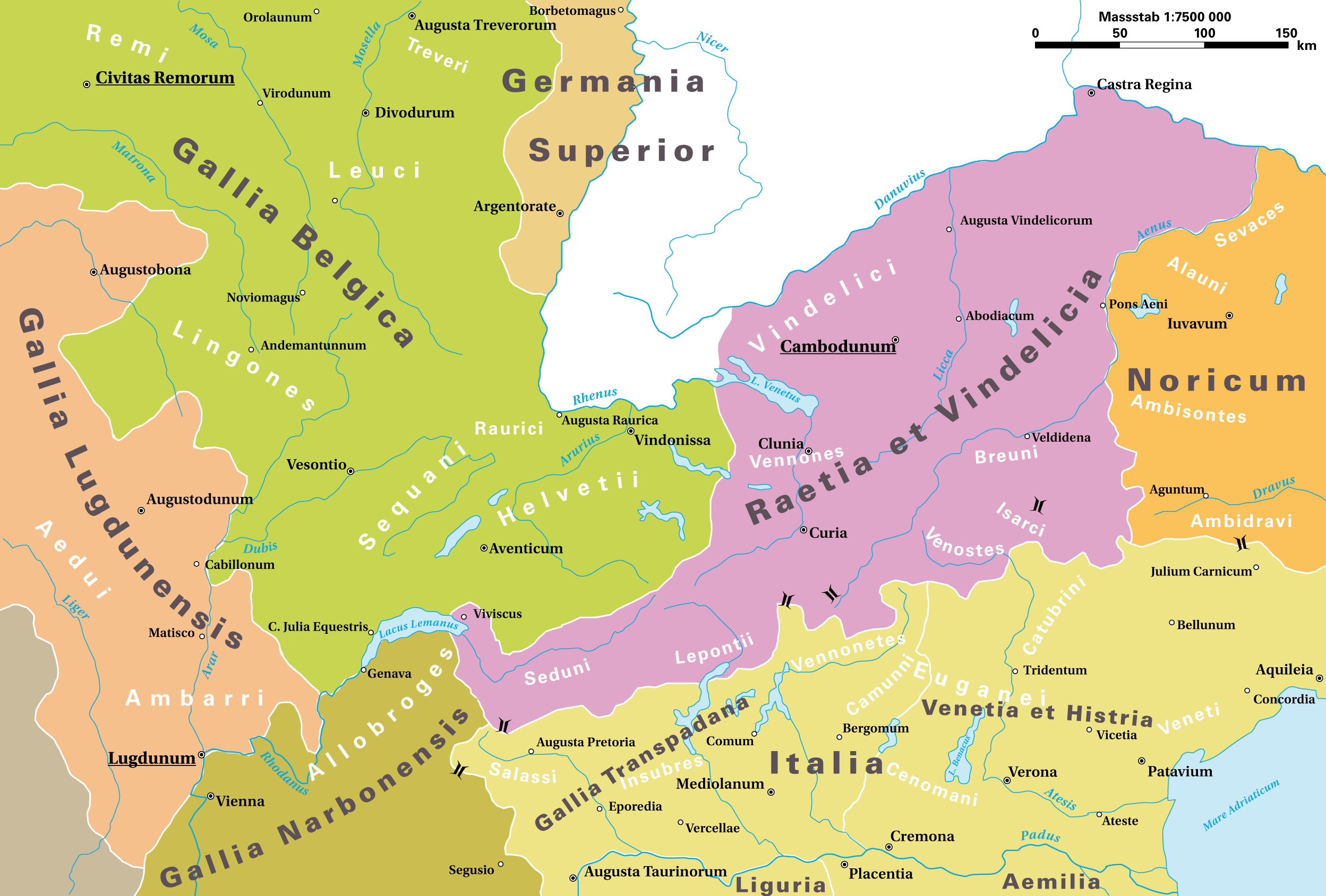
- Map showing the position of the Insubres and Lepontii in or near Gallia Transpadana.

Lepontic is an extinct ancient Alpine Celtic language that was spoken in parts of Rhaetia and Cisalpine Gaul (now Northern Italy) between 550 and 100 BC. Lepontic is attested in inscriptions found in an area centered on Lugano, Switzerland, and including the Lake Como and Lake Maggiore areas of Italy. As a Celtic language, its name could derive from Proto-Celtic *leikʷontio- (which also was the basis of Lepontina, which became the modern (Val) Leventina).

While some recent scholarship (e.g. Eska 1998) has tended to consider Lepontic simply as an early outlying form of Gaulish and closely akin to other, later attestations of Gaulish in Italy (Cisalpine Gaulish), some scholars (notably Lejeune 1971) continue to view it as a distinct Continental Celtic language. In this latter view, the earlier inscriptions found within a 50 km radius of Lugano are considered Lepontic, while the later ones, to the immediate south of this area, are considered Cisalpine Gaulish.

Lepontic was assimilated first by Gaulish, with the settlement of Gallic tribes north of the River Po, and then by Latin, after the Roman Republic gained control over Gallia Cisalpina during the late 2nd and 1st century BC.

== Classification ==
Some scholars view Lepontic as a distinct Continental Celtic language. Other scholars consider it as an early form of Cisalpine Gaulish (or Cisalpine Celtic) and thus a dialect of Gaulish.

An earlier view, prevalent for most of the 20th century and until about 1970, regarded Lepontic as a "para-Celtic" western Indo-European language, akin to but not part of Celtic, possibly related to Ligurian. However, Ligurian itself has been considered akin to, but not descended from, Common Celtic.

Referring to linguistic arguments as well as archaeological evidence, Schumacher even considers Lepontic a primary branch of Celtic, perhaps even the first language to diverge from Proto-Celtic. In any case, the Lepontic inscriptions are the earliest attestation of any form of Celtic, and given its very scanty attestation, it is unlikely that debates over how exactly it is to be classified within Celtic will be resolved any time soon to everyone's satisfaction unless further significant finds come to light.

== Alphabet ==
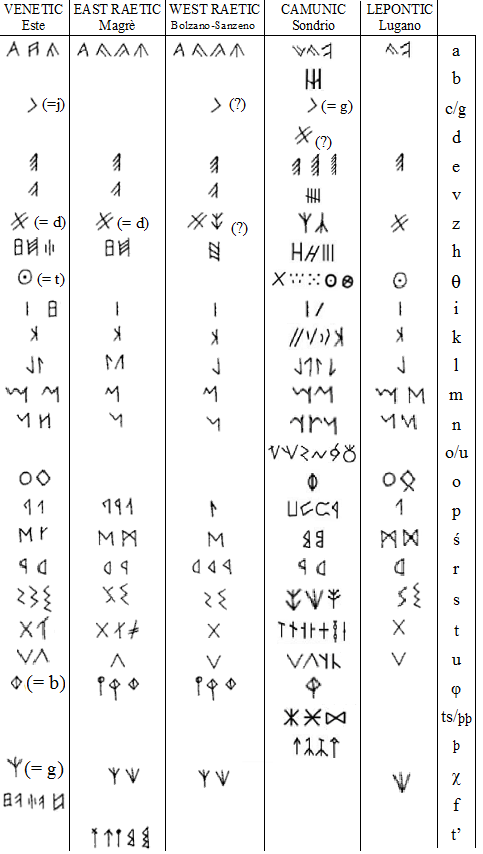
The alphabets of Este (Venetic), Magrè and Bolzano/Bozen-Sanzeno (Raetic), Sondrio (Camunic), Lugano (Lepontic)

The alphabet of Lugano, based on inscriptions found in northern Italy and Canton Ticino, was used to record Lepontic inscriptions, among the oldest testimonies of any Celtic language, in use from the 7th to the 5th centuries BC. The alphabet has 18 letters, derived from the archaic Etruscan alphabet.

The alphabet does not distinguish voiced and unvoiced occlusives, i.e. P represents /b/ or /p/, T is for /t/ or /d/, and K for /g/ or /k/. Z is probably for /t^{s}/. U /u/ and V /w/ are distinguished. Θ is probably for /t/ and X for /g/. There are claims of a related script discovered in Glozel.

== Corpus ==
Lepontic is known from around 140 inscriptions written in the alphabet of Lugano, one of five main Northern Italic alphabets derived from the Etruscan alphabet. Similar scripts were used for writing the Rhaetic and Venetic languages and the Germanic runic alphabets probably derive from a script belonging to this group.

The grouping of all inscriptions written in the alphabet of Lugano into a single language is disputed. Indeed, it was not uncommon in antiquity for a given alphabet to be used to write multiple languages. And, in fact, the alphabet of Lugano was used in the coinage of other Alpine tribes, such as the Salassi, Salluvii, and Cavares.

While many of the later inscriptions are generally identified as Cisalpine Gaulish, the older material is commonly attributed to an indigenous language distinct from Gaulish, conventionally termed Lepontic. Until Lejeune (1971), Lepontic was usually regarded as pre-Celtic, possibly related to Ligurian. Lejeune instead argued that it should be classified as a Celtic language, perhaps as divergent as Celtiberian, yet distinct from Cisalpine Gaulish, a view that has since become standard. Others treat Lepontic as an early or local form of Cisalpine Gaulish itself. The geographic distribution of the inscriptions supports a distinction, as the Cisalpine Gaulish texts are later and concentrated further south, while the earlier Lepontic material shows both similarities to and differences from them.

Although the language is named after the Lepontii, who inhabited parts of ancient Rhaetia in the Alpine region between modern Switzerland and Italy, bordering Cisalpine Gaul, some Celticists, including Joseph F. Eska, extend the term to all Celtic dialects of ancient Italy. This broader usage is disputed by scholars who regard the Lepontii as one of several indigenous pre-Roman Alpine groups, distinct from the Gauls who later settled the northern Italian plains.

The earliest Lepontic inscriptions predate the 5th century BC, with examples from Castelletto Ticino dated to the 6th century BC and possibly from Sesto Calende as early as the 7th century BC. Their authors are generally associated with the Golasecca culture, a Celtic cultural horizon of northern Italy. The disappearance of Lepontic is inferred from the absence of later inscriptions.

=== Funerary inscriptions ===
These are the most common inscriptions in Lepontic, often including merely the name of the deceased, with or without the word pala "(tomb) stone." Two of the slightly longer ones are included below.

==== Carcegna vase ====
metelui maeśelalui uenia metelikna aśmina krasanikna

Probably: "Uenia Metel-ikna [and] Aśmina Krasan-ikna [dedicate this vase] to Metelos Maeśelalos".

==== Vergiate funeral stone ====
pelkui pruiam teu karite iśos kalite palam

Probably: "Iśos dedicated (? or sealed?) [this] sacred (? if teu is from *deywo-) pruiam (tomb?) [and] erected (?) [this] stone to/for Pelkos."

The apparent verbal forms karite and kalite seem to show a -t- preterite, a development also seen in Gaulish. The forms may be two distinct verbs both meaning 'call (for); command, order' (Proto-Celtic *kalyo- and *galwo-) in which case the meaning is more like, "Isos called for the sacred pruiam [to be dedicated] and ordered the stone [be erected]." On the other hand, karite may well be cognate with Gaulish karnite "erected, constructed" (further cognates in Celtic include Old Irish carn "tomb, heap of stones" whence through Scottish Gaelic the English word cairn, and the Gaulish place name Carnuntum).

=== Dedicatory inscriptions ===
==== Ornavasso vase ====
latumarui sapsutai-pe uinom naśom

Probably: "[This] Naxian wine [is dedicated] to Latumaros and Sapsuta"

This inscription is notable for containing the "P-Celtic" form of the Proto-Indo-European conjuctive clitic *-k^{w}e here -pe.

==== Prestino stone ====
On epigraphic and archaeological grounds, this inscription is datable to about 480–450 BC. (See image above.)

uvamakozis plialeθu uvltiauiopos ariuonepos sitis tetu

Probably: "Uvamakozis dedicated (literally 'gave') to Plialethos [these] uvltiaviop-s, arivonep-s [and] sits ("sacred mounds"? see note below)."

Notes:

The name Uvamokozis probably is from Proto-Indo-European *up-mmo-g^{h}ostis "having most esteemed guests", the last element developing through Proto-Celtic *gostis with further cognates in Old Church Slavonic gostъ and Gothic gasts. The apparent development of PIE *p to -v- here is of particular interest for understanding the development of this sound in Celtic (lost in most other branches).

The form sitis is probably from PIE *sēdns "seats" an accusative plural; compare Old Irish sid "sacred mound" from "seat (of the gods), and Latin sēdēs).

The final form tetu probably from PIE *deh_{3}- "give", seen also in Old Irish dorat "has given", Gaulish dede and Celt-Iberian tatuz on the first Botorrita plaque.

== See also ==
- Cisalpine Celtic
- Glozel tablets

== Sources ==
- Ball, M. J.; Fife, J., eds. (2002). The Celtic Languages. Routledge. ISBN 0-415-01035-7.
- de Hoz, Javier (1992). "Lepontic, Celtiberian, Gaulish, and the Archaeological Evidence". Études celtiques. 29.
- De Marinis, R. C. (1991). "I Celti Golasecchiani". In Moscati, Sabatino (ed.). I Celti. Milan: Bompiani. ISBN 88-452-1753-1.
- De Marinis, R. (1981). "Il periodo del Golasecca III A in Lombardia". Studi archeologici. 1. Istituto Universitario di Bergamo.
- Eska, Joseph F. (1998). "The linguistic position of Lepontic". Proceedings of the Berkeley Linguistics Society. 24 (2): 2–11.
- Eska, Joseph F.; Evans, D. E. (1993). "Continental Celtic". In Ball, M. J. (ed.). The Celtic Languages. London: Routledge. pp. 26–63. ISBN 0-415-01035-7.
- Evans, D. Ellis (1994). "Some Remarks on the Study of Old Celtic Proper Names". In Bielmeier, Roland; Stempel, Reinhard (eds.). Indogermanica et Caucasica. Festschrift für Karl Horst Schmidt zum 65. Geburtstag. Untersuchungen zur indogermanischen Sprach- und Kulturwissenschaft. Vol. 6. Berlin–New York: De Gruyter. pp. 306–315.
- Gambari, F. M.; Colonna, G. (1988). "Il bicchiere con iscrizione arcaica de Castelletto Ticino e l'adozione della scrittura nell'Italia nord-occidentale". Studi Etruschi. 54: 119–164.
- Koch, John T. (2006). Celtic Culture: A Historical Encyclopedia. ABC-CLIO.
- Kruta, Venceslas (1991). The Celts. Thames and Hudson. pp. 52–56.
- Lejeune, Michel (1970). "Documents gaulois et para-gaulois de Cisalpine". Études Celtiques. 12 (2): 357–500. doi:10.3406/ecelt.1970.1433.
- Lejeune, Michel (1971). Lepontica. Paris: Les Belles Lettres.
- Lejeune, Michel (1978). "Vues présentes sur le celtique ancien". Bulletin de la Classe des Lettres et des Sciences morales et politiques. 64: 108–121.
- Lejeune, Michel (1988). Recueil des inscriptions gauloises. II.1 Textes gallo-étrusques. Textes gallo-latins sur pierre. Paris: CNRS.
- Markey, Thomas L.; Mees, Bernard (2003). "Prestino, patrimony and the Plinys". Zeitschrift für celtische Philologie. 53 (1).
- Matasović, Ranko (2009). Etymological Dictionary of Proto-Celtic. Leiden: Brill.
- Mees, Bernard (2008). "Early Celtic metre at Vergiate and Prestino". Historische Sprachforschung. 121 (1).
- McCone, Kim (1996). Towards a Relative Chronology of Ancient and Medieval Celtic Sound Change. Maynooth: Department of Old Irish, St. Patrick’s College.
- Pinault, Georges-Jean (2007). Gaulois et celtique continental. Librairie Droz.
- Pisani, Vittore (1964). Le lingue dell'Italia antica oltre il latino (2 ed.). Turin: Rosenberg & Sellier.
- Prosdocimi, Aldo L. (1986). "L'iscrizione leponzia di Prestino: Vent'anni dopo". Zeitschrift für celtische Philologie. 41: 225.
- Prosdocimi, Aldo L. (1991). "Lingua e scrittura dei primi Celti". I Celti. Bompiani. pp. 50–60.
- Roberti, Mario Mirabella (1966). "Un'iscrizione leponzio-ligure a Prestino di Como". Arte Lombarda. 11 (1).
- Schumacher, Stefan; Schulze-Thulin, Britta; aan de Wiel, Caroline (2004). Die keltischen Primärverben. Ein vergleichendes, etymologisches und morphologisches Lexikon. Innsbruck: Institut für Sprachen und Kulturen der Universität Innsbruck. pp. 84–85. ISBN 3-85124-692-6.
- Solinas, Patrizia (1995). "Il Celtico in Italia". Studi Etruschi. 60: 311–408.
- Stifter, David (2008). Old Celtic Languages. University of Vienna. pp. 24–37.
- Stifter, David (2020). Cisalpine Celtic. Language, Writing, Epigraphy. Aelaw Booklet. Vol. 8. Prensas de la Universidad de Zaragoza.
- Stifter, David (2020). "Cisalpine Celtic". Palaeohispanica. 20: 335–365.
- Tibiletti Bruno, M. G. (1978). "Ligure, leponzio e gallico". In Prosdocimi, A. L. (ed.). Popoli e civiltà dell'Italia antica VI: Lingue e dialetti. Rome: Biblioteca di Storia Patria. pp. 129–208.
- Tibiletti Bruno, M. G. (1981). "Le iscrizioni celtiche d'Italia". In Campanile, E. (ed.). I Celti d'Italia. Pisa: Giardini. pp. 157–207.
- Whatmough, Joshua (1933). The Prae-Italic Dialects of Italy, vol. 2: The Raetic, Lepontic, Gallic, East-Italic, Messapic and Sicel Inscriptions. Harvard University Press.
