= Prestino =

District of Como, Lombardy, Italy

Coordinates: 45°48′04″N 9°03′32″E

- Comune
- Comune di Prestino
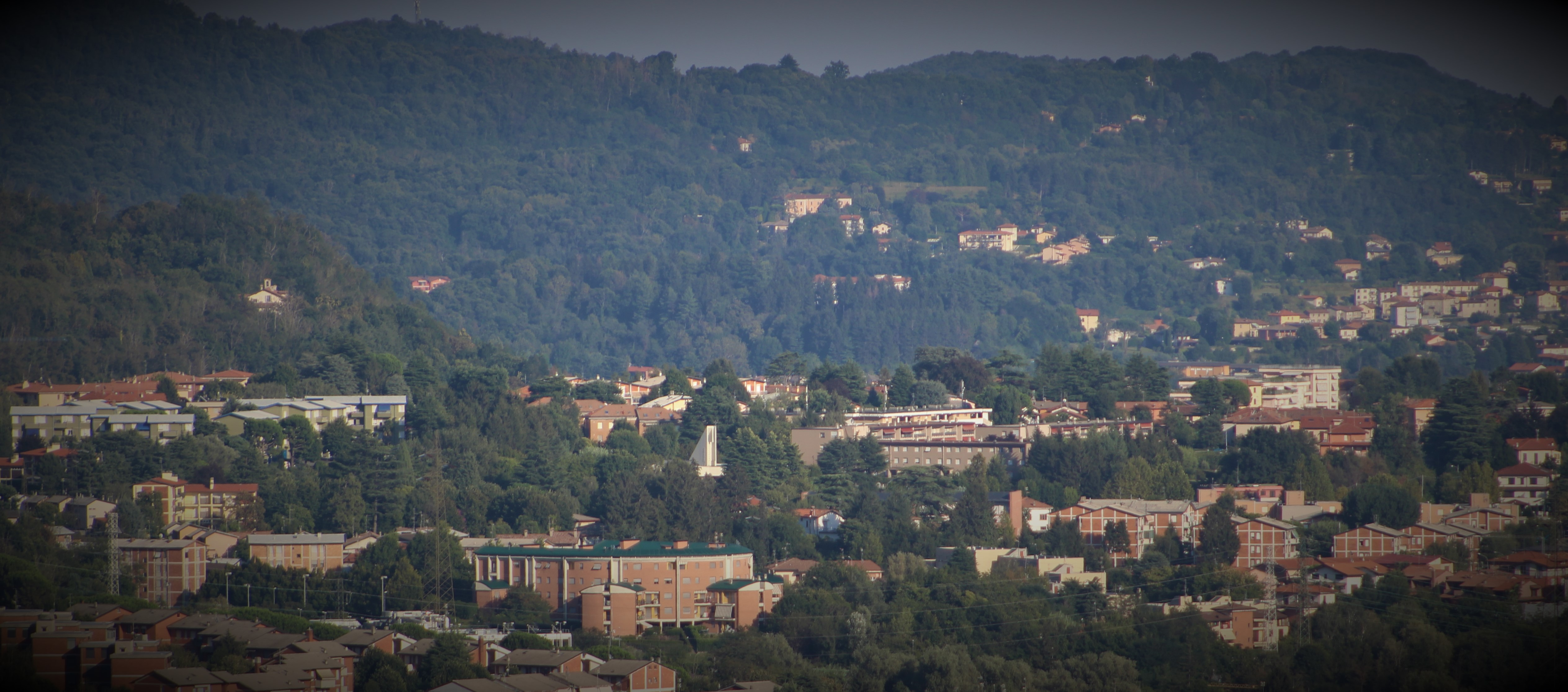

- Location within Italy Location within Lombardy
- Country: Italy
- Region: Lombardy
- Province: Como

Population
  - Total: 3,103
- Time zone: UTC+1 (CET)
  - Summer (DST): UTC+2 (CEST)
- Patron saint: St. Felix, St. Francis of Assisi

Prestino (Lombard: Prestin, Italian pronunciation: [preʃˈtiːŋ]) is a district of Como, Italy, of about 3,000 inhabitants, about 2 km west of that city.

== History ==
Prestino is the site of the discovery of one of the most important inscriptions in the ancient and scantily attested Lepontic language, the Prestino Stone. This is a dedication pictured here, the text of which reads:

uvamakozis plialeθu uvltiauiopos ariuonepos sitis tetu

Probably: "Uvamakozis dedicated (literally 'gave') to Plialethos [these] uvltiaviop-s, arivonep-s [and] sits ("sacred mounds"? if from *sēdns (accusative plural; compare Old Irish sēdēs and Latin se:de:)."

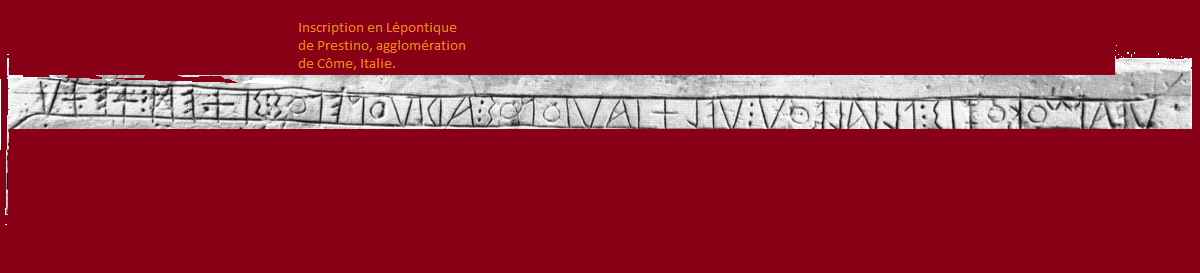
Lepontic inscription from Prestino

== Demographics ==
Inhabitants registered within the municipality of Como:

Year	Population
1981	3447
1991	3847
2001	3682
2008	3650

== Bibliography ==
(Ordered by date of publication)

- Roberti, Mario Mirabella (1966) "Un'iscrizione eponzio-ligure a Prestino di Como" Arte Lombarda, Vol. 11, No. 1, pp. 114-115
- Lejeune, M. (1970–71) "Documents gaulois et para-gaulois de Cisalpine" Études Celtiques, volume 12, issue 2, pp. 452-462
- Prosdocimi, Aldo L. (1986) "L'iscrizione leponzia di Prestino: Vent'anni dopo" Zeitschrift für celtische Philologie Vol.41, p.225
- de Hox, Javier (1992) "Lepontic, Celtiberian, Gaulish, and the Archeological Evidence" Études celtiques vol. 29 pp. 223-240
- Ball, M. J. and J. Fife (eds.) (2002) The Celtic Language Routledge, p. 44-45
- Markey, Thomas L.; Mees, Bernard (2003) "Prestino, patrimony and the Plinys"Zeitschrift für celtische Philologie, Vol.53 (1), p.116
- Matasovic, Ranko (2006) Etymological Dictionary of Proto-Celtic Brill: Leiden, p. 326
- Mees, Bernard (2008) "Early Celtic metre at Vergiate and Prestino" Historische Sprachforschung, Vol.121 (1), p.188-208
- "Mummified body of Italian woman found sitting at a table, 2 years after her death" February 10, 2022 CBS News. Retrieved June 15, 2023. [^1^][1]
