= Carcegna =

Coordinates: 45°48′N 8°25′E

- Frazione
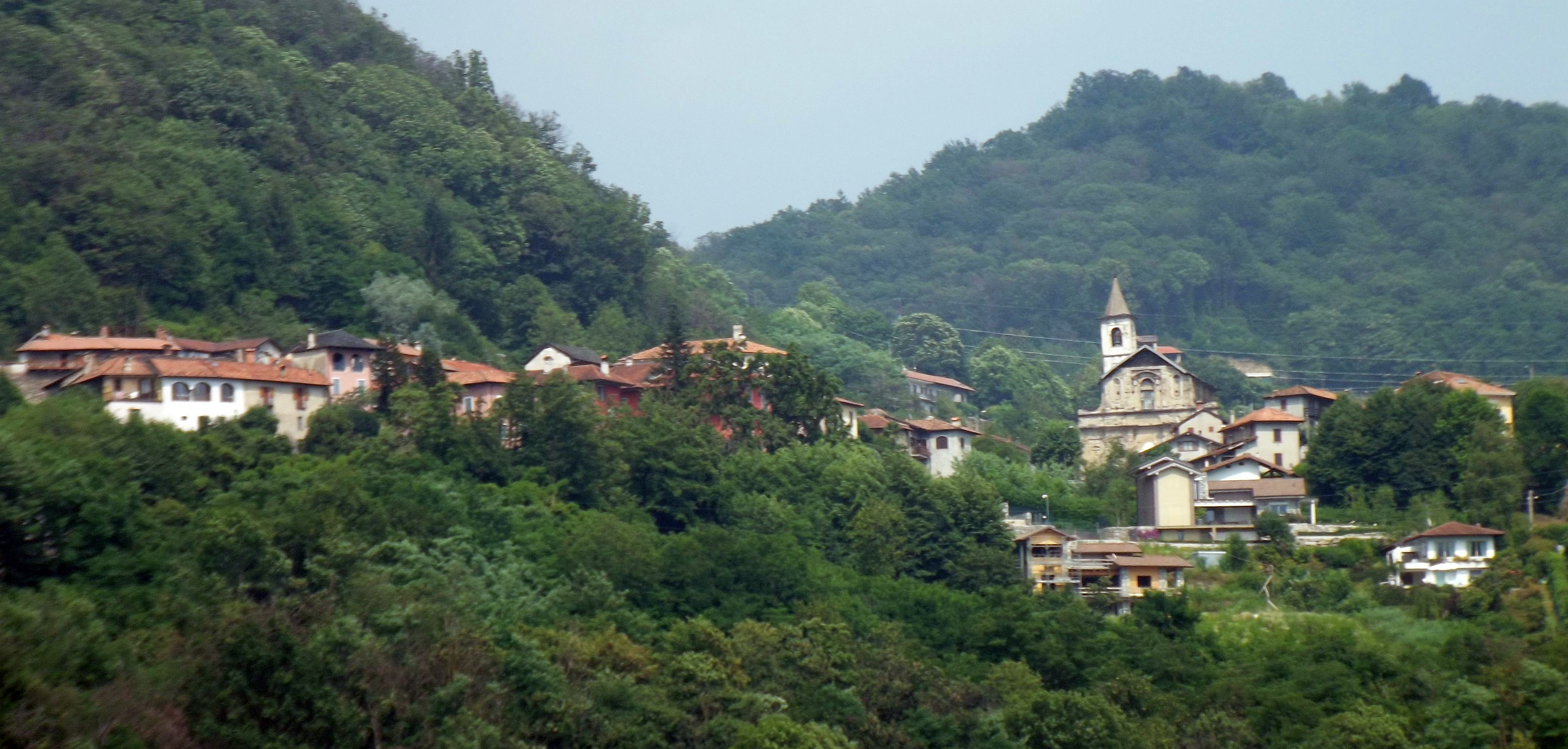
- Panorama from lake Orta

- Location of Carcegna in Italy
- Country: Italy
- Region: Piedmont
- Province: Novara (NO)
- Comune: Miasino
- Time zone: UTC+1 (CET)
  - Summer (DST): UTC+2 (CEST)

Carcegna is a small village located above the eastern shore of Lake Orta, at an altitude of 490m, in the Province of Novara, Piedmont, Italy. Administratively a frazione of the commune of Miasino, it has 260 inhabitants, called Carcegnesi. Its patron saint is Saint Peter, celebrated on 29 June.

Archaeological excavations have brought to light Gaulish, Gallo-Roman and Etruscan remains. In the outskirts of the village there are ruins of a fortification, probably of Lombard origin.

The village is mentioned in the "Liber Cleri" as dependent of the parish church of San Giulio di Orta in 1133.

The current church was built in 1661 over the foundations of the preceding Romanesque one. It has paintings by Luigi Scaramuccia, Giorgio Bonola and Federico Bianchi, and frescos by Luca Rossetti.
