= Cisalpine Celtic languages =

Language group in northern Italy

The Cisalpine Celtic languages of northern Italy include the Lepontic language and the Cisalpine Gaulish language.

Transalpine Celtic refers to Celtic languages on the other side of the Alps (from Rome) such as Transalpine Gaulish.

== See also ==
- Lepontic language
- Gaulish language
- Ligurian (ancient language)
- Continental Celtic languages
