= Cisalpine Gaulish =

Ancient Celtic language and inscriptions

- Region: Cisalpine Gaul
- Extinct: ca. 1st century BC?
- Language family: Indo-European: Celtic; Gaulish? Lepontic?; Cisalpine Gaulish

Language codes
- ISO 639-3: xcg
- Glottolog: cisa1237

The Celtic Cisalpine Gaulish inscriptions are frequently combined with the Lepontic inscriptions under the term Celtic language remains in northern Italy. While it is possible that the Lepontii were autochthonous to Northern Italy since the end of the 2nd millennium BC, it is known from ancient sources that the Gauls invaded the regions north of the river Po in several waves since the 5th century BC. They apparently took over the art of writing from the Lepontii, including some of the orthographic peculiarities. There are 20 Cisalpine Gaulish inscriptions, five of them longer than just one or two words. The inscriptions stem largely from the area south of the Lepontians.

There is an ongoing debate whether Cisalpine Gaulish is a dialect of Gaulish (e.g. Schumacher 2004), or a historical or dialectical continuation of Lepontic (e.g. Eska 2010). In the latter case, the term Cisalpine Celtic refers to the two together, contrasting with Transalpine Celtic (traditionally Transalpine Gaulish) for the Celtic language on the other side of the Alps.

== Lepontic compared to Cisalpine Gaulish ==
=== Common features (not in Transalpine Gaulish) ===
- nn rather than Transalpine Gaulish *nd: *ande- > -ane-, *and(e)-are- > an-are-, ?*and-o-kom- > ano-Ko-
- ^{n}t rather than Transalpine Gaulish *nt: *kom-bog(i)yos > -Ko-PoKios, Quintus → KuiTos, *arganto- > arKaTo-, *longam > loKan
- s(s) rather than Transalpine Gaulish *χs: *eχs > es in es-aneKoti, es-oPnos

=== Differences between Cisalpine Gaulish and Lepontic ===
- Endings in *-m# instead of Gaulish -n#: TeuoχTonion, loKan vs. Lep. Pruiam, Palam, uinom naśom (but also Cisalpine-Gaulish PoiKam, aTom [or: atoś?], and the varying use of *-m# and *-n# throughout the history of Gaulish).
- word formation: ending of 3rd person sg./pl. preterite in -u, cp. karnitu(s) (Gaulish karnitou), versus Lepontic KariTe, KaliTe (but also Transalpine Gaulish dede)
- Gaulish patronymic suffix is typically -ikno/a vs. Lepontic -alo-, -ala-, -al (but also mixed in Late (?) Lepontic)

== See also ==
- Lepontic language
- Gaulish language
- Continental Celtic languages
- Ancient peoples of Italy
- Cisalpine Gaul
- Cisalpine Celtic

== Bibliography ==
- Stifter, D. 2020. Cisalpine Celtic. Language, Writing, Epigraphy. Aelaw Booklet 8. Zaragoza: Prensas de la Universidad de Zaragoza.
- Stifter, D. 2020. «Cisalpine Celtic», Palaeohispanica 20: 335–365.
