= Luca Rossetti (painter) =

Italian painter

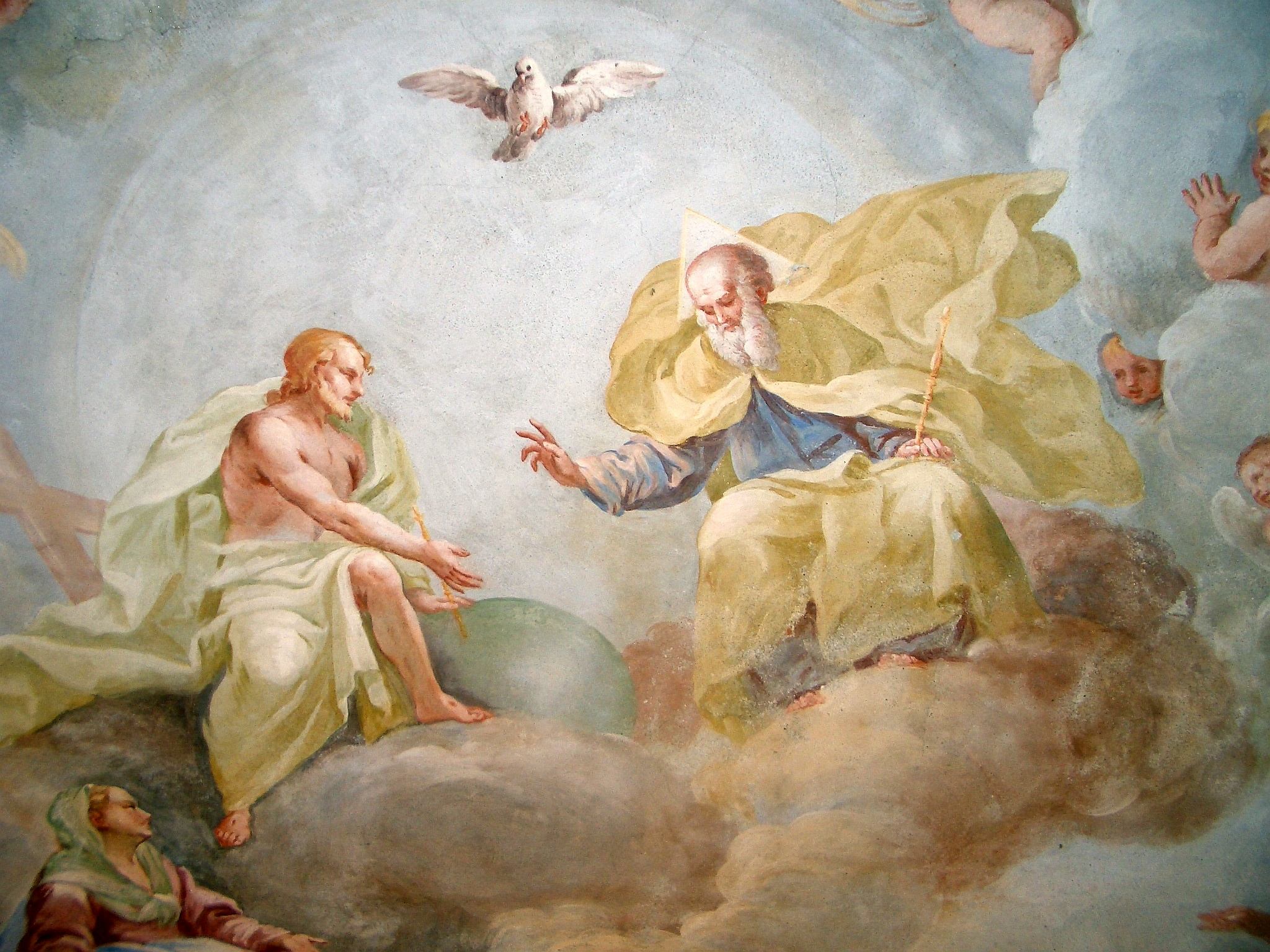
Fresco of the Holy Trinity (1758-1759) in church of San Gaudenzio by Luca Rossetti.

Luca Rossetti (1705–1770) was an Italian painter and architect of the 18th century, active in the region of the Piedmont (when he was born, part of the Savoyard state which adopted the name Kingdom of Sardinia when he was in his late teens). He painted in a style combining luminous late-Baroque and early-Neoclassic styles. He painted the fresco of the Holy Trinity.

He was born in Orta San Giulio and active in Ivrea, including in the church of San Gaudenzio.
