= Newton Stone =

Early medieval stone

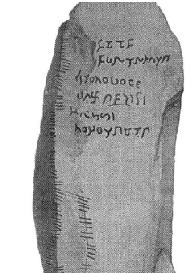
- Country: Scotland
- Region: Aberdeen
- City/Village: Originally Old Rayne, currently Culsalmond
- Produced: 6-7th Century
- Dimensions: 203cm High, 50cm Wide, 26cm Thick

Ogham letters:
- ᚛ᚔᚇᚇᚐᚏᚏᚅᚅᚅᚃᚑᚏᚏᚓᚅᚅᚔᚔᚑᚄᚔᚑᚄᚏᚏ᚜, many readings suggested

Text - Native:
- IDDARRNNNVORRENNI(I/R)OS(I/R)OSRR, many readings suggested

Other resources:
- Ogham; Ogham inscription

The Newton Stone is an early medieval stone with two inscriptions on it, one in ogham and one in an unknown script. The stone was discovered in 1803 by George Hamilton-Gordon, 4th Earl of Aberdeen, in Pitmachie Farm around Old Rayne. Later, local Scottish antiquarian Alexander Gordon relocated the stone into the garden of Newton House in Culsalmond.

The Newton Stone is one of two stones; the symbols etched into the second are distinctly Pictish. They show a serpent and a Z-rod alongside a double disc, which can be seen on other Pictish stones around Scotland. The Newton Stone has four carvings: the six-line inscription on the face of the stone, the ogham inscription with a recently observed incised mirror symbol on a flat facet near the side base, and a spiral near the base of the back. Canmore ID of the stone is 18086.

== Ogham inscription ==
The ogham inscription has 25 letters and follows a natural ridge on the left side of the stone, curving upwards at the bottom along an added stemline. Skene (1865) was one of the first scholars to suggest transcription of the ogham, he read it as UDDDAROTNUNNGORRMAONNEAGEJOSAEI. He stated that ogham consists of "mixed Gaelic and Welsh forms", though did not claim it was Pictish. Skene also thought that the place date of the stone was around 891 AD.

Browne (1921) interpreted inscription as AIDDAIFORTRENNIQNNNUAIOSII, and translated it as "The memorial stone of Aed, King or Ruler of Fortren, of the race of IOS".

Kelly Kilpatrick (2021) propounds reading IDDARRNNNVORRENNI(I/R)OS(I/R)OSRR, as well as mentioning 16 other interpretations of inscription proposed. She suggests that the first part of inscription, "IDDARRNN", can be a Pictish personal name, similar to the ones found on Brodie and Scoonie stones - "EDDARRNONN" (possibly from Latin "aeternus" or Proto-Celtic *īsarnom). The term "VORRENN", she derives from Proto-Celtic *ufor- ("on", "over"). Kilpatrick also says that "The Newton Stone may have been a memorial stone", considering its location and translations of scholars, and claims that the stone most likely is of Pictish origin. Forsyth (1996) compares this term to the Irish name Forann, and the last "IOSRR" she compares with the Irish name Ross.

== Unknown script ==
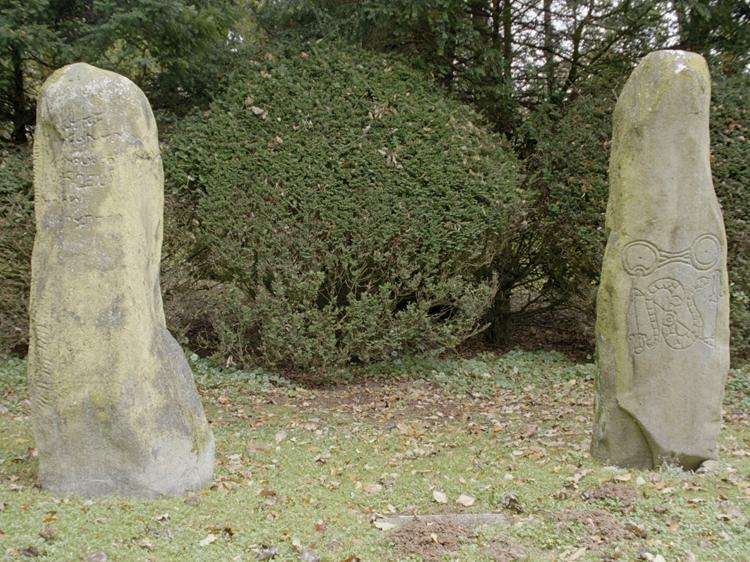
Two stones in the garden of the Newton House

The stone has an inscription written in an unknown alphabetic script consisting of 43 symbols across the top front, and has attracted scholars for the last two centuries, also due to the symbol similar to swastika in the 4th row, which can be possibly compared to the letter x in Latin alphabet. The letters on the Newton alphabetic inscription are most similar to Late Antique informal writing found on media such as wax tablets, lead curse tablets and ceramics. The existence of the stone also implies that some people in early Pictish Aberdeenshire had knowledge of writing using an informal, stylus-based Latin-letter script. Numerous theories about the script's meaning and language have been suggested. Mill (1863) suggested a Phoenician origin of the inscription, Graves (1885) proposed Greek and Latin, Moore (1865) considered script written in Hebrew and Sanskrit, though many scholars agreed on the inscription being a "debased Roman cursive". The unknown script is also often compared to the glosses from Codex Usserianus Primus and Springmount Bog Tablets.

Kilpatrick suggested reading of the script as:

(E)TT(E)(E)
(U)R(Y/e)(R)M(Y/e) (P?/Q?)
G(Y/e)O(n/H)OUO(C/T)
(U)(R/S) ( B/D[ I])(S/L?)I
(N/H?) ( S/g/Q)(S/g/Q)I
(N/n/H)O(or U /s) O(Y/e)(T?)

Kilpatrick drew comparisons between the first line and items on Pictish Ogham inscriptions such as [E]TTE (Lunnasting) and EHTE (Cunningsburgh). A cognate of Welsh map and Gaelic mac ("son") may be present in the last three letters of the second line. The third line may contain the name Geon (as GYON), as in the "cohort of Geon" of Vita Columbae, which may a personal name, or associated with the territorial name Cé. Kilpatrick states that "the beginning and the remainder of the inscription are still obscure," but "feels closer to finally being understood" pointing at potential reading of letters 27 through 29 as the Pictish name Bili or Beli (as in Bridei son of Beli) as an example.

In 1907 William Bannerman read the text as:

ETTE
CUNANMAIN
MAOLOUOEG
UN ROFIIS I
H-INSSI
LOAOARUIN

He stated that the text of the script is unambiguously written in Old Gaelic, but had similar vocabulary and syntax to Latin. He also said that "MAOLOUOEG" is referred to Saint Moluag, Scottish missionary from the 6th century. The "LOAOARUIN" here, according to Bannerman, is connected to the modern Firth of Lorn in Western Scotland.

- Draw nearto the soulof Moluagfrom whom came knowledge (of the faith). He wasof the Islandof Lorn.

Moore interpreted the script through Hebrew as:

BGVB
BMITIM AITI
AOR KB KM KVKK
MI PONA INZRN
LAIK KMAA
BKI IKTNI KOKDI

Tomezzoli and Serafimov (2015) saw the inscription as "FITF FUNTNT-G- CIGOLOUOTE U- - - IEZIKI F–SSI LOMOG-UT", mostly interpreting it through phoenician and sarmatian alphabets, suggesting that the writer was influence by Iazyge culture. They translated the inscription as "Know you, who are outsider (from outside), the great power and the Iazyges belong to the Speaking one (God)". They suggested that swastika sign could mean solar concept or be the sign of the royal power.

Some scholars showed skepticism, claiming that the unknown script is a modern forgery. Gordon, on other hand, claimed that the carving technique of the stone is typical to Pictish Class I symbol stones, and "there is therefore no reason to regard the Newton alphabetic inscription as a forgery on technical grounds".
