= Tullycommon Bone =

Archaeological find

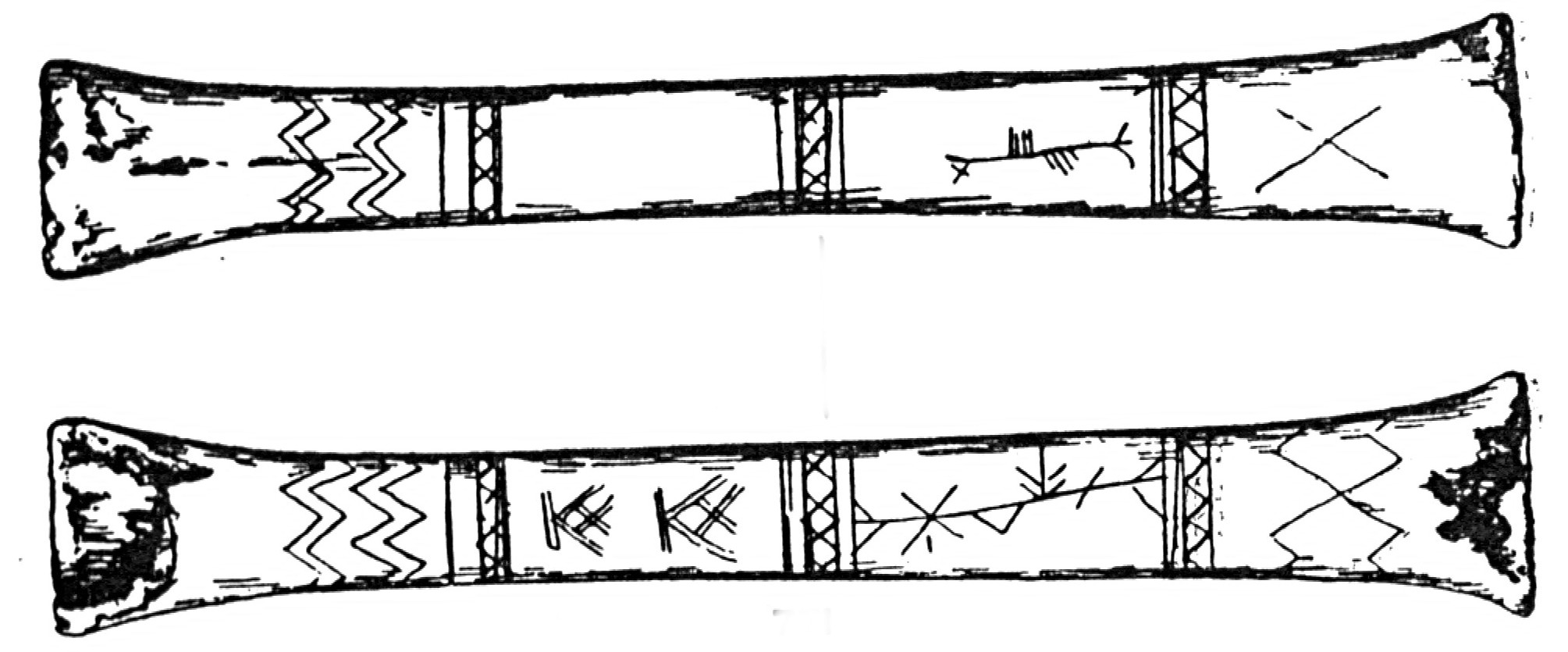
Image of the two sides of the Tullycommon bone

The Tullycommon Bone (CIIC 52) is an archaeological find, discovered in 1934 during excavations of the fortification of Cahercommaun in the townland of Tullycommon (Irish: Tulach Chumann), County Clare, Ireland. It is a complete metacarpal bone of a sheep with an Ogham inscription on each side. The find dates from the 7th to the 10th century.

== Inscription ==
The Tullycommon bone has a short Ogham inscription next to various decorative elements such as zigzag lines on each side.

The characters are clearly Ogham characters. A fact that is also typical of Ogham inscription lines with those used start and stemlines whose tips go through the main line. In order to mark the beginning of one of the two inscriptions, instead of the arrow running to the right, as with the Buckquoy spindle-whorl, an X next to the stemline is used.

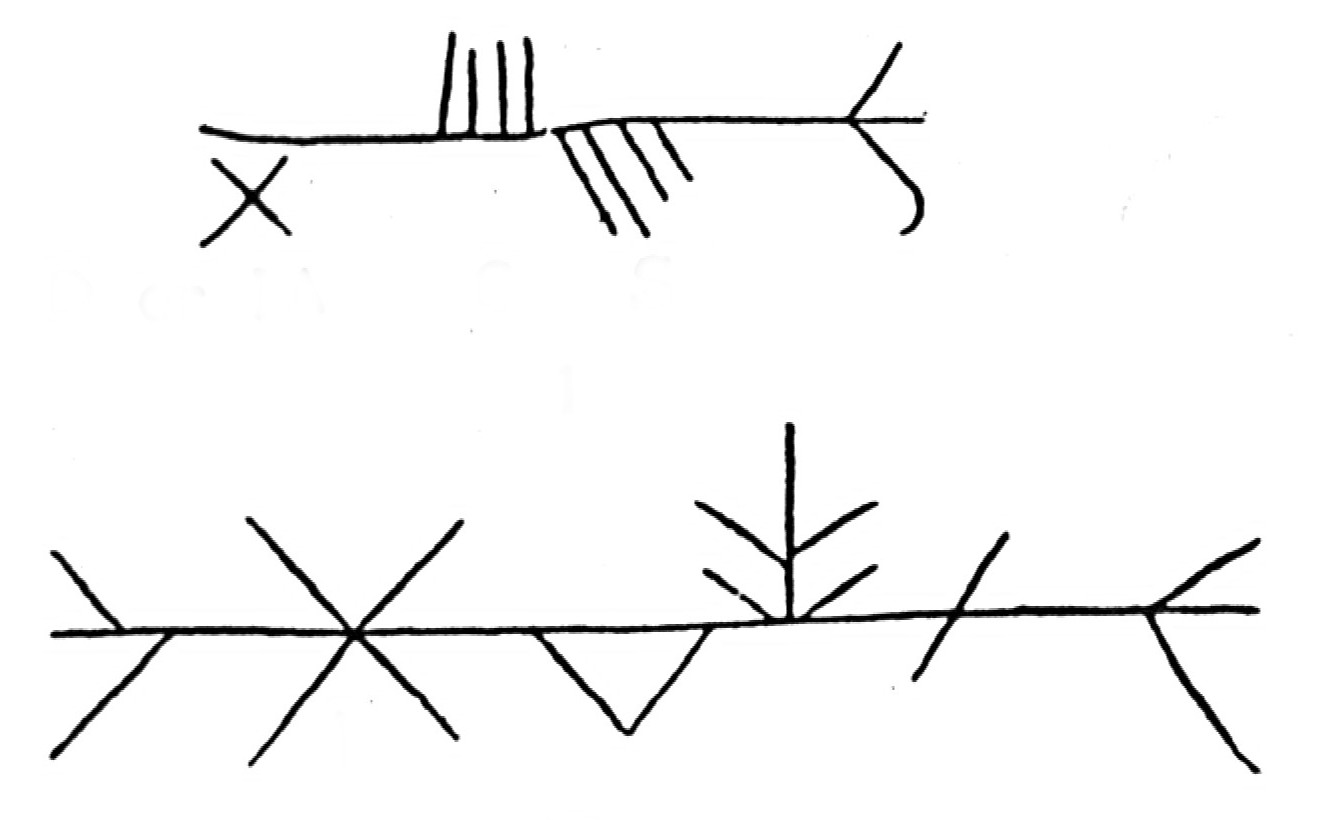
Ogham letters

The signs for C and S are clearly recognizable as Ogham signs on one side of the bone. On the other side may also be recognized the sign for the sound sequence EA (which was also used for K and resembled an X) as well as the sign for M (character before stemline).

It is not possible to decipher the inscription. According to Macalister, "It makes no sense to decipher a short inscription of this kind ...". If these are not doodles, the signs may actually have been used for magical purposes. Perhaps the bone was one of a whole series of bones used for fortune-telling.

== Special feature ==
The Tullycommon bone is one of the rare small finds reported so far in the Ogham specialist literature. Unlike the approximately 400 finds in which the Ogham signs are carved onto stone slabs and columns, these are small artifacts (mainly everyday objects), of which only 6 have been discovered in Ireland, including the Ballinderry dice, the Ballyspellan brooch, the Dublin Castle crest, the Ennis bead and the Kilgulbin hanging-bowl.

== Literature ==
- Forsyth, Katherine (2007). "An Ogham-inscribed plaque from Bornais, South Uist". In Smith, Beverley Ballin; Taylor, Simon (eds.). West over Sea. Studies in Scandinavian Sea-Borne Expansion and Settlement Before 1300. A Festschrift in Honour of Dr Barbara E. Crawford. The Northern World. Vol. 31. Leiden. pp. 461–478. doi:10.1163/ej.9789004158931.i-614.157. ISBN 9789047421214.
- Macalister, R. A. S. (Robert Alexander Stewart) (1945). Corpus Inscriptionum Insularum Celticarum. Vol. 1. Dublin. (Reprinted 1996)
