= Brandsbutt Stone =

Pictish stone in Aberdeenshire, Scotland

Brandsbutt Symbol Stone
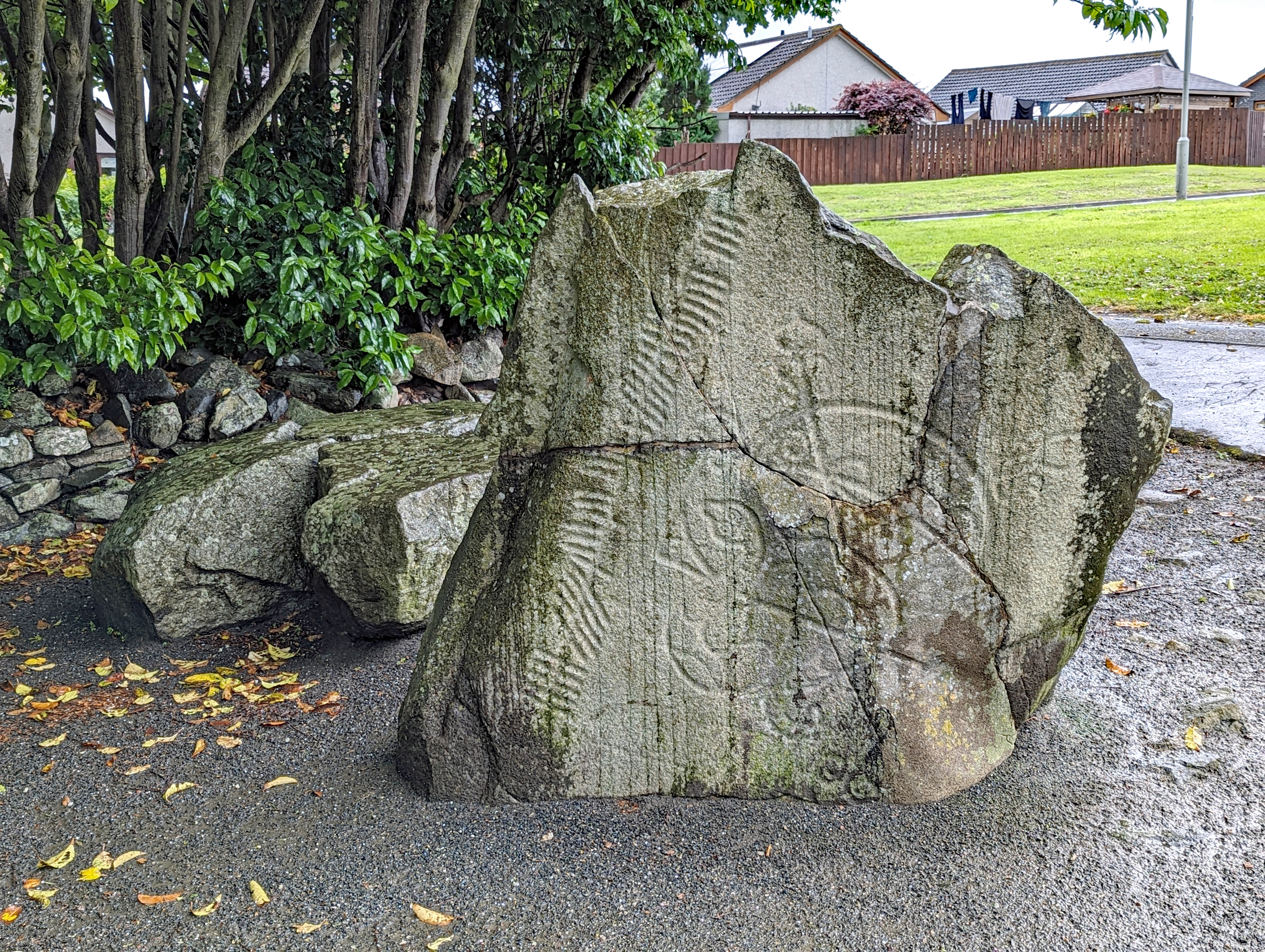
- The Brandsbutt Stone, showing detail of ogham script
- Material: Whinstone
- Height: 1.07 m (3.5 ft)
- Width: 1.27 m (4.2 ft)
- Writing: Ogham script: irataddoarens
- Symbols: Crescent and v-rod; Serpent and z-rod
- Present location: Inverurie, Aberdeenshire, Scotland
- Coordinates: 57.2916°N 2.4000°W
- Classification: Class I incised stone
- Culture: Pictish

Designations

Scheduled monument
- Official name: Brandsbutt Symbol Stone
- Type: Crosses and carved stones: inscribed stone; symbol stone
- Designated: 31 December 1924
- Reference no.: SM90039

The Brandsbutt Stone is a class I Pictish symbol stone in Inverurie, Aberdeenshire, Scotland.

== Description ==
A large block of whinstone, 1.07 metres (3.5 ft) high, 1.27 metres (4.2 ft) wide and 0.91 metres (3.0 ft) deep, the stone had been broken up and used in building a dry stone wall before 1866. The stone, now reassembled, bears two incised Pictish symbols, a crescent and v-rod and a serpent and z-rod, and an inscription in Ogham, IRATADDOARENS. The carvings of the Brandsbutt Stone are dated to around AD 600. It is a scheduled monument.

== Inscription ==
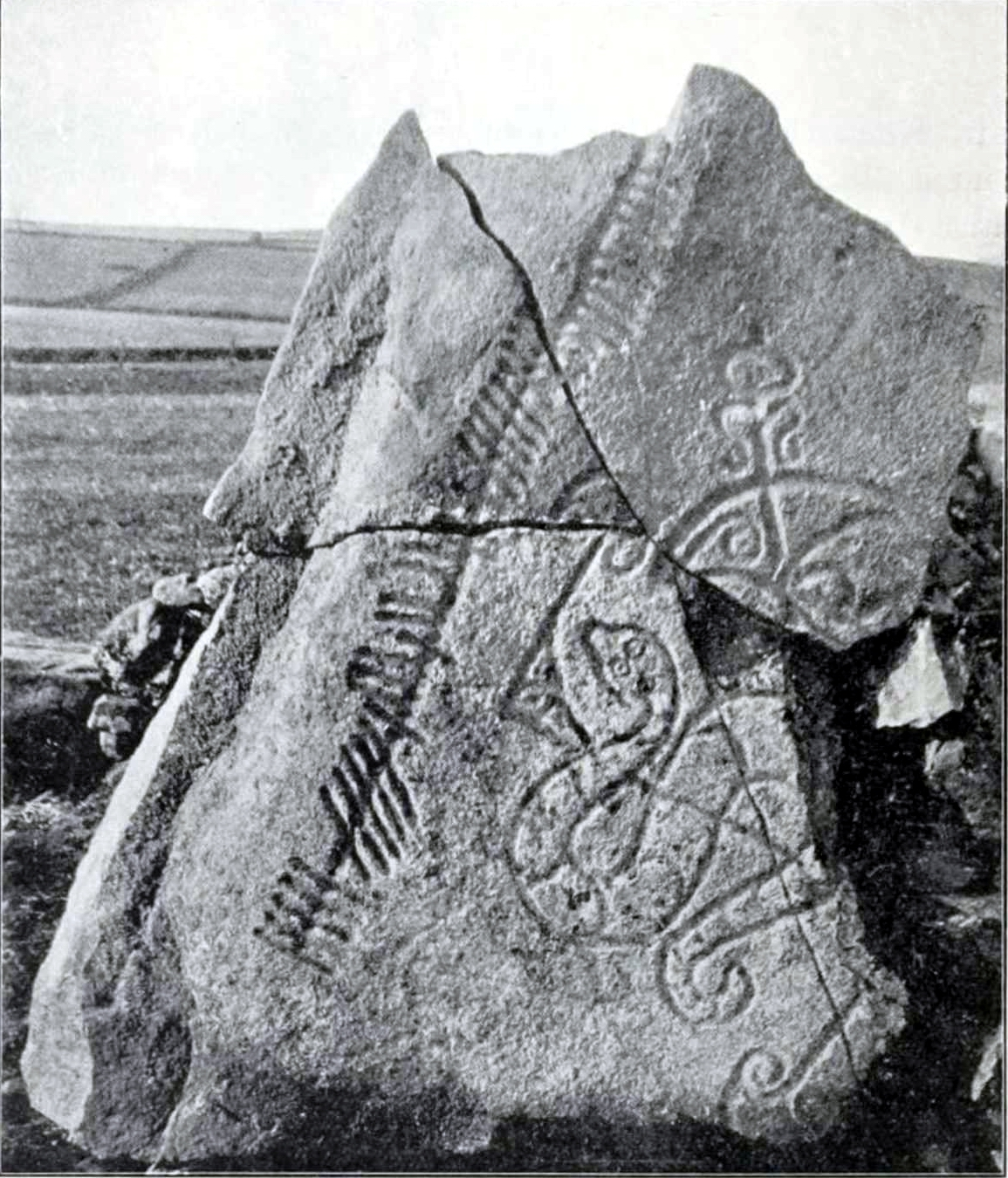
Archaeological photograph of 1903

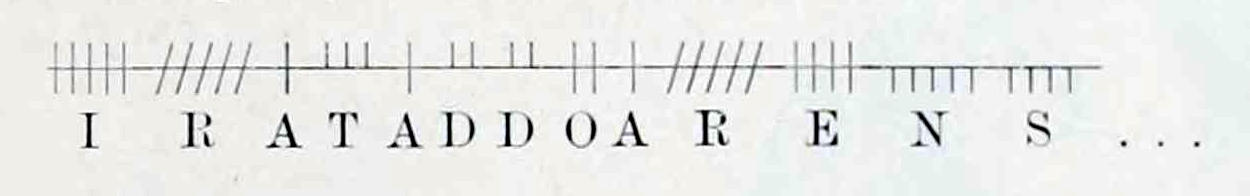
Transliteration of Ogham

The inscription borne by the Brandsbutt Stone, IRATADDOARENS, has been described by Katherine Forsyth as appearing to be "utterly baffling". However, a handful of interpretations have been offered. Suggestions include the possibility that it may contain a corrupted version of the personal name Ethernan. If this is the case, it is likely to refer to the 7th century saint Ethernan about whom little is known but who was apparently venerated by the Picts. He is referred to in an entry from the Annals of Ulster from 669 AD as having been killed by the Picts along with Corindu. It is thought that these names may be P-Celtic and therefore Pictish in origin.

Other examples of the name Ethernan being preserved on Pictish stones include, in Ogham, The Newton Stone (IDDARRNNN), Rodney's Stone (EDDARRNON) and The Scoonie Stone (EDDARRNONN), and, in Latin script, The Fordoun Stone (PIDARNOIN).

The ira- may be a Pictish verb cognate with Breton irha meaning "he lies". However, the existence of this verb is doubtful, according to Rodway.

Thomas Clancy proposed that the text represents the Gaelic phrase i rath Aduarén s- meaning "this is the property of Aduarén here".
