= List of listed buildings in Culsalmond =

This is a list of listed buildings in the parish of Culsalmond in Aberdeenshire, Scotland.

== List ==
Name	Location	Date Listed	Grid Ref. (Note: Sometimes known as OSGB36, the grid reference (where provided) is based on the British national grid reference system used by the Ordnance Survey. • "Guide to National Grid". Ordnance Survey. • "Get-a-map". Ordnance Survey.)	Geo-coordinates	Notes	LB Number (Note: Historic Environment Scotland assign a unique alphanumeric identifier to each designated site in Scotland, for listed buildings this always begins with "LB", for example "LB12345".)	Image
Mort House Culsalmond Burial Ground				57°23′08″N 2°34′59″W	Category C(S)	2961	Upload Photo
Williamston House				57°22′28″N 2°35′11″W	Category B	2964	Upload Photo
Garden Walls, Newton House				57°21′24″N 2°33′33″W	Category B	2963	Upload Photo
Culsalmond Old Parish Church Culsalmond Burial Ground				57°23′08″N 2°35′01″W	Category A	2960	Upload another image See more images
Mill- House Of Williamston				57°22′08″N 2°35′24″W	Category C(S)	30	Upload Photo
Williamston Home Farm				57°22′31″N 2°35′06″W	Category B	2965	Upload Photo
Newton House				57°21′24″N 2°33′51″W	Category B	2962	Upload Photo

== Key ==
The scheme for classifying buildings in Scotland is:

- Category A: "buildings of national or international importance, either architectural or historic; or fine, little-altered examples of some particular period, style or building type."
- Category B: "buildings of regional or more than local importance; or major examples of some particular period, style or building type, which may have been altered."
- Category C: "buildings of local importance; lesser examples of any period, style, or building type, as originally constructed or moderately altered; and simple traditional buildings which group well with other listed buildings."

In March 2016 there were 47,288 listed buildings in Scotland. Of these, 8% were Category A, and 50% were Category B, with the remaining 42% being Category C.

== See also ==
- List of listed buildings in Aberdeenshire
