= Anna Ritchie =

Anna Ritchie may refer to:

- Anna Ritchie (archaeologist) (1943–2026), British archaeologist and historian
- Anna Cora Mowatt (also Ritchie; 1819–1870), American writer

== See also ==
- Anne Thackeray Ritchie (1837–1919), English writer
