= Faddan More =

Townland in County Tipperary, Ireland

Faddan More (Irish: An Feadán Mór) is a townland in County Tipperary, Ireland. The townland of Faddan More (sometimes "Faddenmore") is in the subparish of Carrig, which in turn forms part of the parish of Birr in County Offaly. In addition, Faddan More is in the historical Barony of Ormond Lower.

Faddan More includes a large peat bog, which in the past has met the solid-fuel requirements in the form of peat (or, more colloquially "turf") of a large part of the midlands. The peat used to be cut using a slanted implement called a slean, but in latter years has been harvested with the aid of machinery. An early medieval Christian psalter now known as the Faddan More Psalter was discovered here in July 2006 in the peat bog.
