= Faddan More Psalter =

Early medieval psalter from Ireland

Coordinates: 53°03′13″N 7°59′57″W

The cover of the psalter, after conservation

The Faddan More Psalter (Irish: Saltair an Fheadáin Mhóir) (also Irish Bog Psalter or "Faddan Mor Psalter") is an early medieval Christian psalter or text of the book of Psalms, discovered in a peat bog in July 2006, in the townland of Faddan More (Irish: Feadán Mór) in north County Tipperary, Ireland. The manuscript was probably written in about 800 CE in one of a number of monasteries in the area. After several years of conservation work, the psalter went on display at the National Museum of Ireland – Archaeology in Kildare Street, Dublin in June 2011.

This discovery was hailed by the National Museum of Ireland as one of the most significant Irish archaeological finds in decades. Bernard Meehan of the Trinity College Library, who advised on the discovery, said that he believed the psalter was the first discovery of an Irish early medieval manuscript in two centuries. During the conservation process, in the period 2006–2010, the inside of the leather cover was found to be lined with papyrus, probably as a stiffening; it has been suggested that this points to links between Irish Celtic Christianity and the Coptic churches at the time.

The psalter joins the very small number of very early Western books that have survived fully intact with their original bookbindings. These mostly have their origins in the monastic Insular art of Britain and Ireland, and the Celtic and Anglo-Saxon missions to Europe. The earliest is the St Cuthbert Gospel of about 700 (British Library), and other examples probably of the mid-8th century are at Fulda on the continent. However the wallet-like style of the Faddan More binding, and that it does not seem to have been physically attached to the sewn-together pages, make it unique among surviving covers.

== Description ==
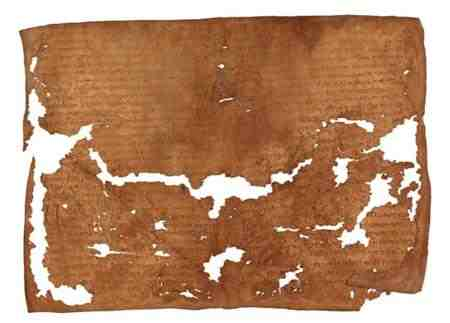
A sheet of Faddan More Psalter

The psalter contains the Latin text of the Psalms, complete on 60 sheets of vellum in five gatherings or quires. The text is a Gallican version of the Vulgate, written in Insular majuscule letters in a single column. The first letter of each psalm has a capital and, as is often the case, the opening words of psalms 1, 51 and 101 are decorated, using black, red, and yellow.

The original leather binding has a fold-over flap with three horn buttons that were probably used to secure a thong or straps, now missing, that tied the cover up; it does not seem to have been physically attached to the gathered and sewn-together pages inside, forming what we might call today a folder or wallet. Similar covers seem to be shown in some images in manuscripts, but no comparable covers have survived. The outside of the cover was "painted with black carbon-based pigment". The leather seems to have been used as a trial piece or sketchpad for composing patterns of interlace for other objects. On the inside there is a sheet of papyrus, presumably used as a liner to stiffen the cover somewhat.

Low oxygen levels in the bog provide unusual preservation conditions, and bogs were often used by Irish monks as hiding places for valuables in the face of Viking raids. In addition to low oxygen levels, sphagnum moss, of which the peat bog is composed, produces an antibiotic substance called sphagnan that binds with proteins on the surface of microorganisms, immobilising them. Its highly reactive carbonyl groups can alter chemicals and nutrients that would otherwise decompose organic matter. And above all the sphagnum moss causes organic material to undergo chemical changes itself that make it impervious to rot.

== Discovery ==
It was uncovered by bulldozer driver Eddie Fogarty, a worker extracting peat with a backhoe. Patrick Wallace, director of the National Museum, praised Fogarty for immediately having covered the book with damp soil, as exposure to dry air after so many centuries of dampness might have destroyed it. The book was initially stored in refrigeration at the National Museum. Identifying the safest way to pry open the pages without damaging or destroying them was expected to take months, and conservation work to take two years. The area around Faddan More Bog is rich in medieval history. Monastic foundations such as Lorrha and Terryglass in County Tipperary and Birr and Seirkieran in County Offaly are located nearby.

The bog is owned by local brothers Kevin and Patrick Leonard. Six years before the psalter find, a leather satchel was found that, by radiocarbon dating, was estimated to originate from between the seventh and ninth centuries. This was found just 100 metres (330 ft) from where the psalter was found and is of a similar date, suggesting that the satchel may have originally contained the book. Additionally, in the years before 2006, two ancient wooden vessels were found in the same bog.

== Misreported prophecy ==
When found, the book was opened to a page displaying Psalm 83 (in the Septuagint numbering), which corresponds with Psalm 84 in the Masoretic numbering used in most English-language translations. Due to confusion regarding differences in numbering the Psalms, some news sites implied that the Psalter was open at the Masoretic Psalm 83. That psalm contains such lines as "They have said, Come, and let us cut them off from being a nation; that the name of Israel may be no more in remembrance"; this reference to the attempted destruction of Israel connected the find in some people's minds with the contemporaneous 2006 Israel-Lebanon conflict. The matter was clarified by the director of the National Museum of Ireland, who pointed out the difference in Septuagint vs. Masoretic numbering and that the displayed psalm contains no reference to the destruction of Israel.

== Conservation ==
The psalter was in poor condition, due to the acidic peat bog which had, however, been responsible for preserving it. It was in visibly so bad a condition that someone in the British Museum put a picture of the mass in a staff area captioned "if you think you have a bad day ahead ...".

The National Museum of Ireland consulted with specialists in archaeological conservation and book conservation about the best way to conserve the psalter, and received partly conflicting advice. Ultimately a multi-phase conservation plan was determined. The first phase involved non-destructive examination of the psalter in the form in which it was discovered, e.g. photography, MRI scanning, and examination of the binding by book-binding specialists. In the second phase, experiments were done on 18th century parchments to determine the best way of drying waterlogged parchment. The most effective method involved soaking the parchment in ethanol to replace the water, placing it between blotting sheets, and vacuum-packing it. In the third phase, this technique was tested on small fragments of the psalter, and found to be effective. Conservators then began applying this method to larger sections of the psalter, and found they could consistently achieve shrinkage of only 2–5%, against 75% on a small fragment that was air-dried.

Dewatering was carried out over four years using a vacuum chamber to minimise shrinkage and decay. Then dismantling was carried out. The letters, written in iron gall ink, were preserved better than spaces between letters, many of which had dissolved, so it was necessary after drying to piece them together in the right sequence. The process was described in a book from the National Museum of Ireland, The Faddan More Psalter, The Discovery and Conservation of a Medieval Treasure published in November 2021.

== See also ==
- Cathach of St. Columba, a 6th-Century Irish psalter
- Springmount Bog Tablets, 7th-century Irish psalter written on wooden wax tablets
- Clonycavan Man and Old Croghan Man, 2003 Irish bog finds
