= Lunnasting stone =

The Lunnasting stone is a stone bearing an ogham inscription, found at Lunnasting, Shetland and donated to the National Museum of Antiquities of Scotland in 1876.

== Discovery ==
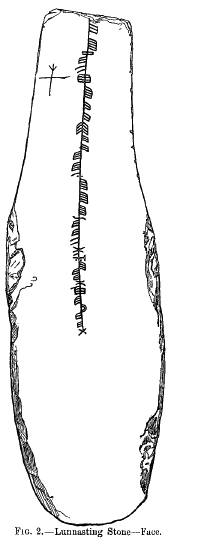
Ogham inscription on the Lunnasting stone

The stone was found by Rev. J.C. Roger in a cottage, who stated that it had been unearthed from a "moss" (i.e. a peat bog) in April 1876, having been discovered five feet (1.5 m) below the surface.

The stone is made of slate and is 44 inches (1.1 m) long, by about 13 inches (0.33 m) in breadth and 1 inch (2.5 cm) thick with the inscription on the flat surface. In addition to the ogham letters, which are arranged down a centre line, there is a small cruciform mark near the top, which may be a runic letter or a Christian cross. It is unknown whether this mark was made at the same time as the ogham, or added later.

== Inscription and date ==
The Pictish inscription has been read as:

ttocuhetts: ahehhttmnnn: hccvvevv: nehhton by Allen and Anderson (1903)

ettecuhetts: ahehhttannn: hccvvevv: nehhtons by Forsyth (1996)

The script probably contains the personal name "Nechtan", and Diack (1925) took the view that the last two words mean “the vassal of Nehtonn“ but it is otherwise without certain interpretation. Forsyth suggests Ahehhttannn is also a personal name.

Other recent attempts include:

"King Nechtan of the kin of Ahehhtmnnn"
"The widow of Kenneth made (these as) testimonials on her part".

The word-dividing dots suggest Norse influence, but this could pre-date the Viking occupation of Shetland, and an eighth- or ninth-century origin is likely for the ogham work.

== Other theories ==
The difficulties in providing a clear interpretation of the script have led to a number of other suggestions.

Vincent (1896) suggests that the stone may have been erected by "Irish missionary monks not earlier than A.D. 580" and quotes an unnamed expert's transcription of the ogham as:

eattuicheatts maheadttannn hccffstff ncdtons.

Lockwood (1975) writes that "the last word is clearly the commonly occurring name Nechton, but the rest, even allowing for the perhaps arbitrary doubling of consonants in Ogam, appears so exotic that philologists conclude that Pictish was a non-Indo-European language of unknown affinities". This view was also taken of the ogham inscribed on the Orcadian Buckquoy spindle-whorl until its 1995 interpretation as Old Irish.

A language of Basque origin has also been suggested as providing a solution:

etxekoez aiekoan nahigabe ba nengoen (English: "The one of the house found me without will in the pain.")

although the original speculations in 1968 by Henri Guiter do not appear convincing and were not well received academically. The Vasconist scholar Larry Trask said "like the majority of such dramatic announcements, this one has been universally rejected. Pictish specialists dismiss it out of hand, and vasconists have been no more impressed". The criticisms focus on random readings being assigned to Ogam letters, alleged complete decipherment of inscriptions too weathered to be read with certainty, the use of 20th century Basque rather than reconstructed Proto-Basque forms, disregarding syntax and highly fanciful translations.

The [e]ttecuhetts part has been understood as an early Brittonic expression, meaning "this is as far" (cf. Welsh cyhyd, "as long as"), a suitable message for a boundary stone.

== See also ==
- Pictish language
- Käymäjärvi inscriptions, another northern European stone with what could be undeciphered writing on it
