= Cathach of St. Columba =

6th-century Latin psalter from Ireland

- Royal Irish Academy
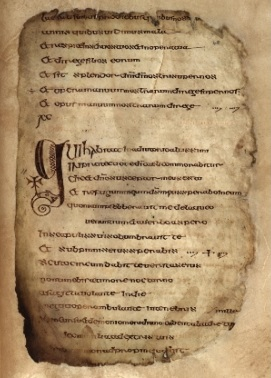
- Folio 48r, Cathach of St. Columba
- Also known as: The Battler
- Type: Psalter
- Date: Before AD 561
- Place of origin: Ireland
- Language: Vulgar Latin
- Material: Vellum
- Size: 27cm x 19cm
- Format: Folio
- Condition: Poor
- Script: Insular

The Cathach of St. Columba, known as the Cathach (meaning "the Battler"), is a late 6th century Insular psalter. It is the oldest surviving manuscript in Ireland, and the second oldest Latin psalter in the world. Its cumdach (a type of ornamented metal reliquary box or carrying case for holy books) dates to the late 11th century, and was refurbished in the 14th and 16th centuries. The shrine belonged to the Chiefs of Clan Ó Domhnaill, the Lords of Tír Chonaill, as a rallying cry and protector in battle.

The Cathach was taken to the continent in 1691 following the Treaty of Limerick, and did not return to Ireland until 1813. That year the cumdach was reopened, leading to the rediscovery of the manuscript. It was by then in very poor condition, but underwent a major restoration in 1982 when the extant pages were rebound and remounted on vellum leaves. However the Cathach remains badly damaged, with just 58 vellum leaves surviving from an original 110.

Today the manuscript (RIA MS 12 R 33) is in the Royal Irish Academy in Dublin and the cumdach is in the archaeology branch of the National Museum of Ireland.

== History ==
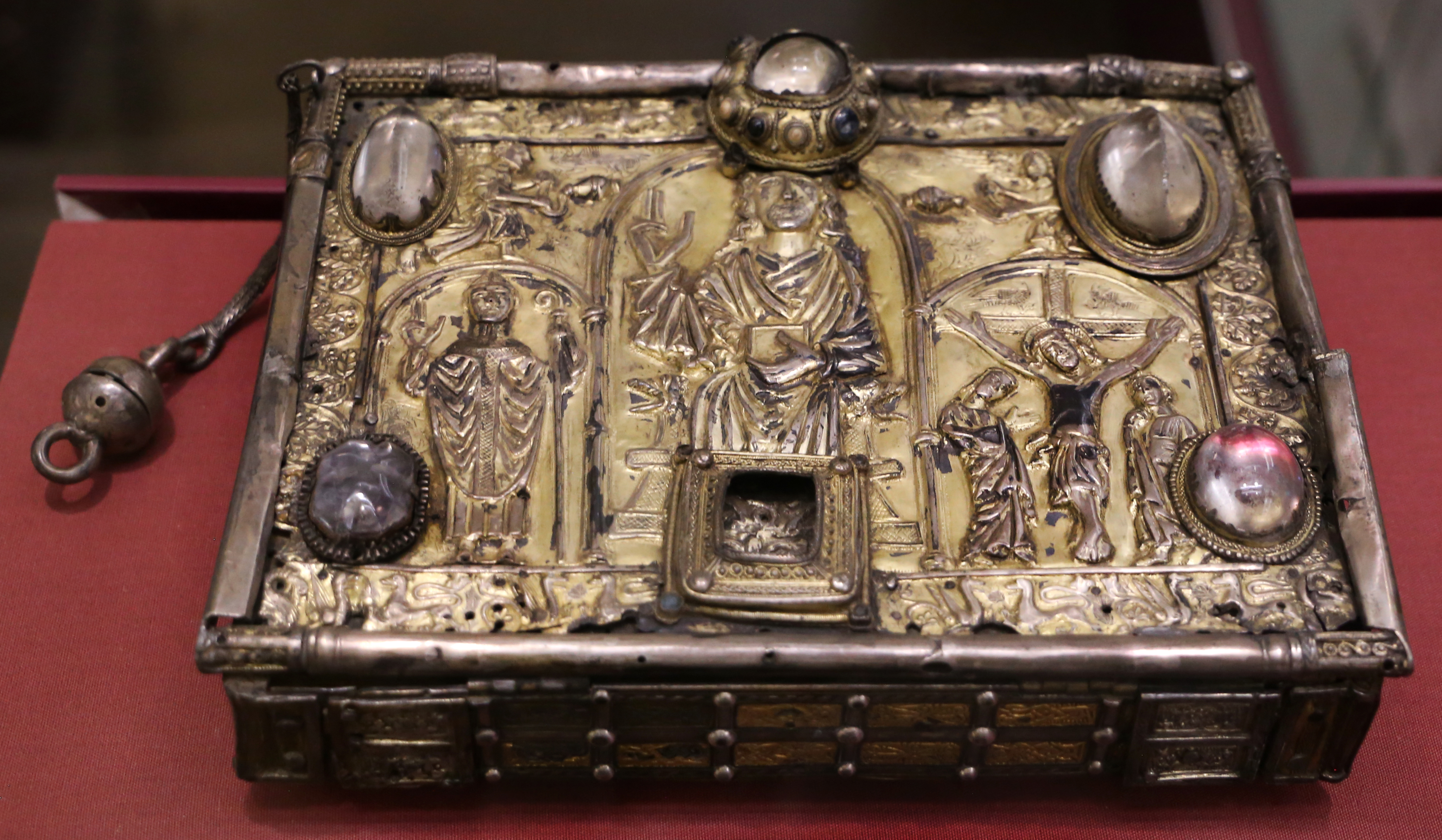
The Cumdach of the Cathach

An Cathach was used as a rallying cry and protector in battle. It was said to protect and guarantee victory in war to the Donegal leaders. Before a battle it was customary for a chosen monk or holy man (usually attached to the Clan McGroarty, and someone who was in a state of grace) to wear the Cathach and the cumdach, or book shrine, around his neck and then walk three times sunwise around the warriors of Clan O'Donnell.

As de facto Chief of the Name of Clan O'Donnell, the manuscript was inherited by Brigadier-General Daniel O'Donnell (1666–1735), and was regarded by him, in accordance with its traditional history, as a talisman of victory if carried into battle by any of the Cinel Conaill. He first served King James II during the Williamite War in Ireland and then, following the Treaty of Limerick, General O'Donnell went into exile in France and served King Louis XIV as an officer in the Irish Brigade. He placed the Cathach in a silver case and deposited it for safety in a Belgian monastery, leaving instructions in his will that it was to be given up to whoever could prove himself Chief of Clan O'Donnell. Through an Irish abbot it was restored to Sir Neale O'Donnell, 2nd Baronet, of Newport House, County Mayo, in 1802. His son, Sir Richard Annesley, entrusted the relic to the Royal Irish Academy in 1842. The leaves were stuck together until separated at the British Museum in 1920; the manuscript was further restored in 1980–81.

== Description ==
=== Manuscript ===
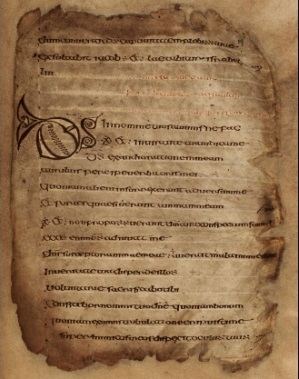
Folio 19r, note the abraded and stained edges caused by impact damage as the pages moved against the cumdach, which was not large enough to hold them flat in place.

The manuscript consists of a Gallican version of the Vulgate version of Psalm 30:13 to 105:13, and is traditionally assumed to have been written by St. Columba (Colum Cille, d. 597). It is dated to 560–600, measures 27 cm x 19, and at present consists of 58 folios; the complete manuscript would have contained around 110 folios.

Decoration is limited to the initial letter of each Psalm. Each initial is created from a thick black line that is larger than the main text and decorated with trumpet, spiral and guilloche patterns. They are often outlined with orange dots, and have areas of the lettering coloured white, madder, pink and orange tinges. The art historian Françoise Henry described the initial as "an essential landmark in the history of insular illumination", and speculated that the now lost front page "would have been invaluable for our knowledge of Irish illumination".

The initials are followed by a series of letters that gradually diminish in size before merging with the main text.

Irish manuscripts were typically written in localized scripts. The Cathach written for the most part by a single scribe who used a book hand of round lettering and strong Latin or wedge-serifs on the upright strokes. According to the historian and calligraphier Timothy O'Neill, the scribe employed an edged rather than pointed quill, which he held at a flat angle "to produce thick downstrokes and thin horizontals".

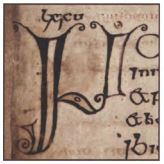
folio 35r (detail)

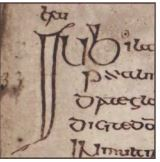
folio 26r (detail)

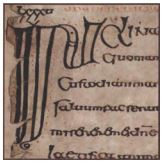
folio 43v (detail)

=== Cumdach (book shrine) ===
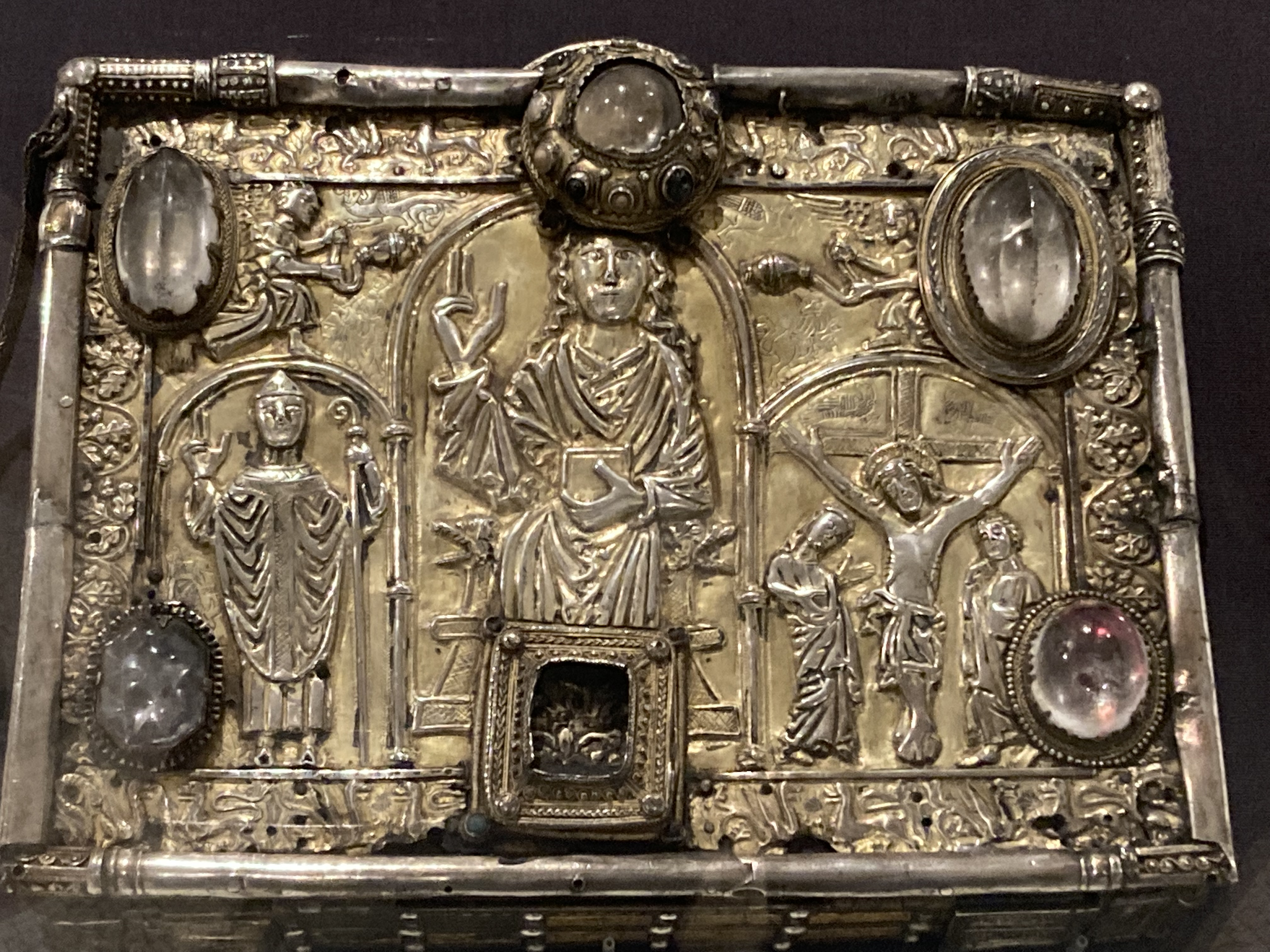
The Shrine of the Cathach. Length: 8.5 in (220 mm), width: 7.25 in (184 mm), breath: 2.1 in (53 mm). National Museum of Ireland, NMI R2835

The specially made cumdach (book shrine) comprises an oblong, hinged wooden box covered with decorative bronze and gilt-silver plates, with mounts holding glass and crystal settings. Prior to this the manuscript would likely have been kept in a type of protective leather satchel known as a "tiag", similar to that made for the 9th century Breac Maodhóg.

The shrine underwent three main phases of construction. The initial work was completed between 1062 and 1098 at Kells, County Meath while the manuscript was in the possession of the O'Donnells and was their chief relic. A new main face in gilt repoussé was added between 1350 and 1375 with a large seated Christ in Majesty flanked on the right by a Crucifixion scene, and by a saint (likely Columba) on the left. Further embellishments and repair works were carried out in the 16th century, and again in 1723 while it under the care of Daniel O'Donel while he was in Paris.

The cumdach has been in continuous use since its earliest construction, including by its hereditary keepers, the Magroarty family, of Ballymagrorty, County Donegal, one of whom was killed in 1497 when the shrine was captured. It is today in the collection of the National Museum of Ireland.

==== Side panels ====
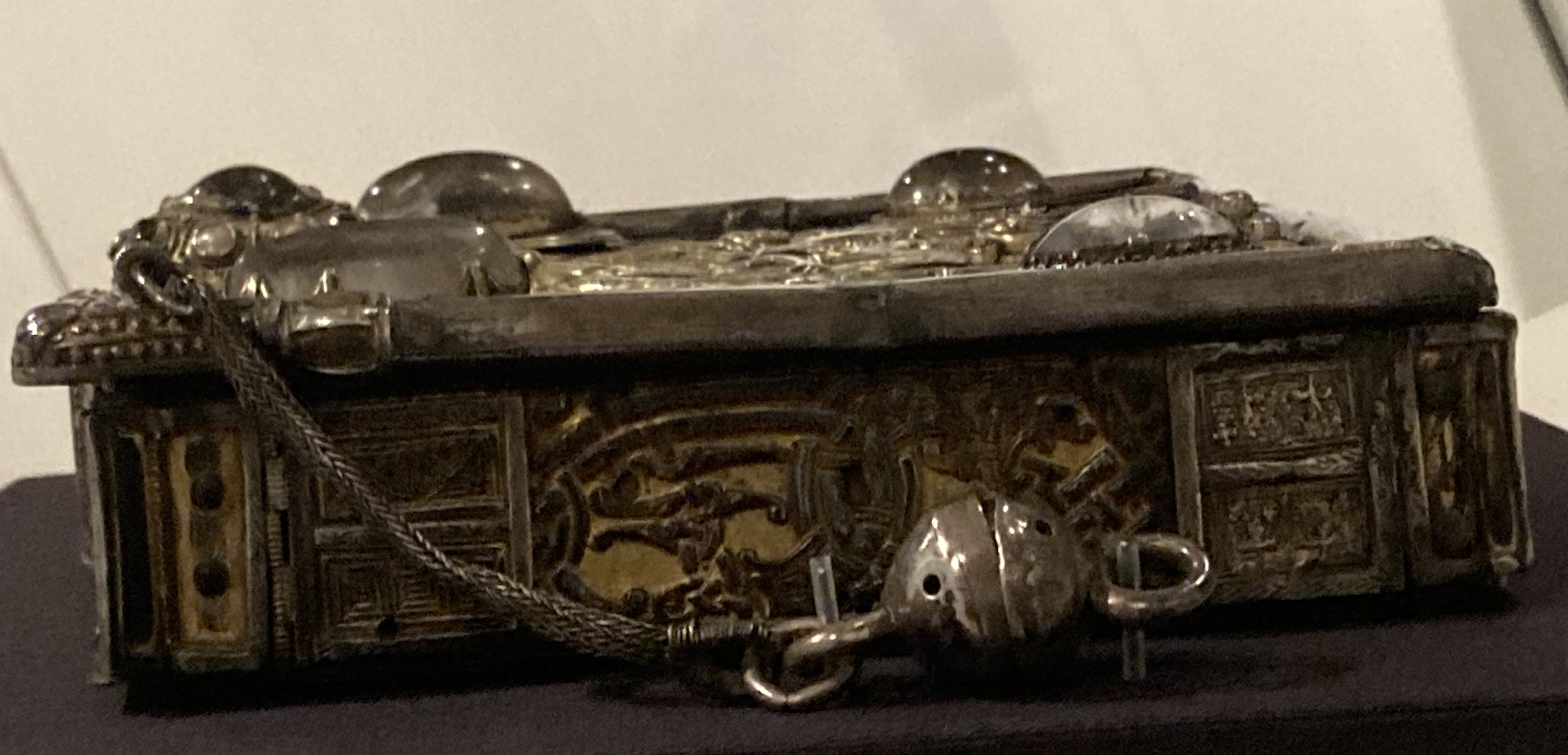
Short-side

The long and short side panels contain inserts and mounts of different phases. The long sides mainly consist of traditional animal ornaments and abstract designs. The dominant mounts on the short sides contain more sophisticated patterns influenced by the Ringerike style of Viking art.

==== Inscriptions ====
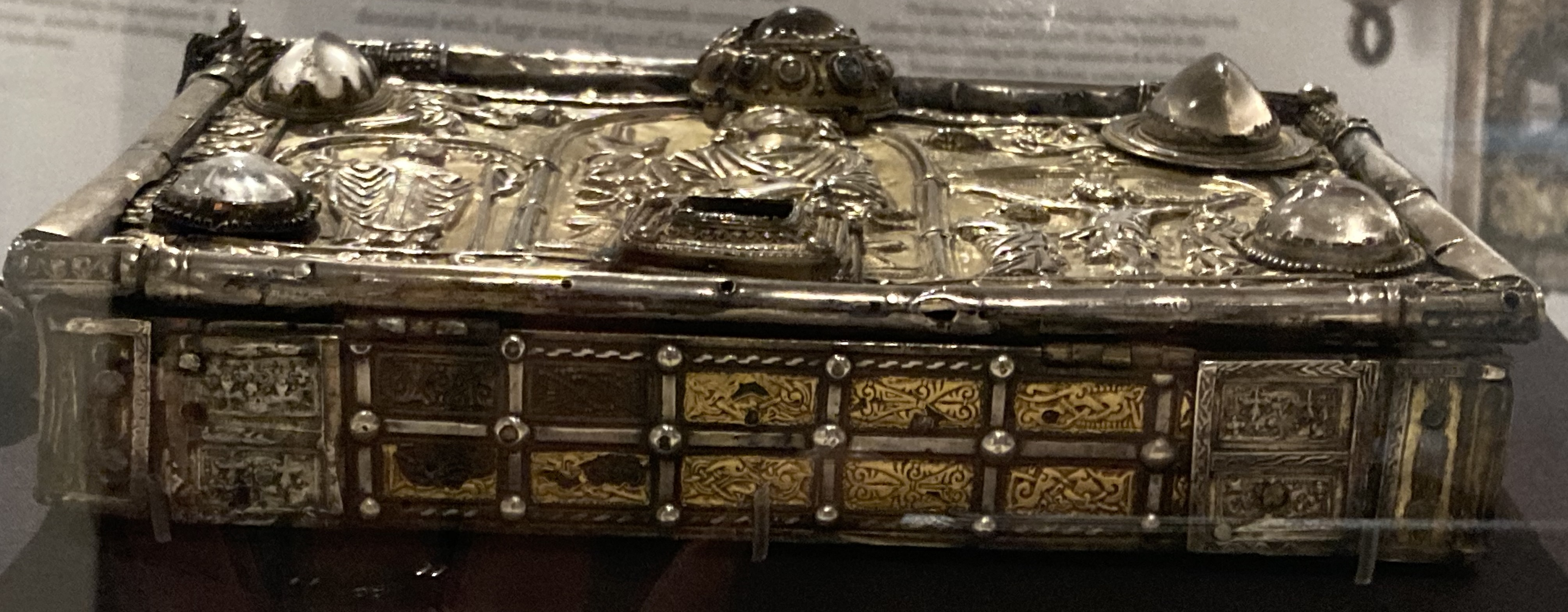
Lower long-side

The shrine contains a number of inscriptions, that were modified or added to at later dates. The lettering is badly damaged in places; the wording contains misspellings and contractions. Written in Irish and placed clockwise along the borders of the reverse of back of the shrine (beginning at top-left), they are signed by its goldsmith, Sitric Mc Meic Aeda (Sitric, son of Meic Aeda), who records that he built the shrine under the instruction of Domnall Mac Robartaigh (an abbot at Kells who had retired before his death in 1094, but is described in the inscription as "successor of Kells”), who in turn was under the commission and payment of Cathbarr Ua Domnaill.

The full inscription has been translates as:

"A prayer for Cathbarr Ua Domnaill who had this shrine made
and for Sitric son of Mac Aeda who made [it]
and for Domnall Mac Robartaig, coarb of Kells, by whom it was made".

Nothing is known of Sitric outside of a record that his father worked as a craftsman at Kells. Given the number of misspellings and lack of consistency in the script, it has been suggested that Sitric was illiterate and was simply transcribed a script given to him.

== See also ==
- Springmount Bog Tablets, a 7th-century Irish psalter written on wooden wax tablets
- Faddan More Psalter, a 9th-century psalter found in a peat bog in 2006

== Sources ==
- "Audit of Columban Heritage", by Neil Jackman and Dr. Conor Ryan, prepared for Donegal County Council, Derry City & Strabane District Council, Foras na Gaeilge and The Heritage Council, Abarta Heritage, Ireland, November 2018 [f].
- De Hamel, Christopher. A History of Illuminated Manuscripts. Boston: David R. Godine, 1986.
- Henry, Françoise. Irish Art in the Early Christian Period to 800 A D. Methuen, 1965
- Herity, Michael; Breen, Aidan. "The Cathach of Colum Cille: An Introduction". Dublin: Royal Irish Academy, 2002. ISBN 978-1-8740-4597-7
- Joynt, M. "The Cathach of St. Columba". The Irish Church Quarterly, volume 10, No. 39, July 1917. JSTOR 30067688
- Lucas, Anthony. "The Social Role of Relics and Reliquaries in Ancient Ireland". The Journal of the Royal Society of Antiquaries of Ireland, volume 116, 1986. JSTOR 25508904
- Moss, Rachel. Medieval c. 400—c. 1600: Art and Architecture of Ireland. London: Yale University Press, 2014. ISBN 978-03-001-7919-4
- Mitchell, Perette. "The Inscriptions on Pre-Norman Irish Reliquaries". Proceedings of the Royal Irish Academy: Archaeology, Culture, History, Literature, volume 96C, no. 1, 1996. JSTOR 25516156
- Mullarkey, Paul. "Colmcille 1500 Lecture Series: The many phases of the shrine of the Cathach Archived 3 January 2022 at the Wayback Machine". National Museum of Ireland, 10 November 2021
- O'Neill, Timothy. "The Cathach, Colum Cille and the foundation of the manuscript tradition Archived 3 January 2022 at the Wayback Machine". Royal Irish Academy, 6 December 2021
- O'Neill, Timothy. The Irish Hand: Scribes and Their Manuscripts From the Earliest Times. Cork: Cork University Press, 2014. ISBN 978-1-7820-5092-6
- Stokes, Margaret, Early Christian Art in Ireland, 1887, 2004 photo-reprint, Kessinger Publishing, ISBN 0-7661-8676-8, ISBN 978-0-7661-8676-7
- Stokes, Roy. A Bibliographical Companion. Scarecrow Press, 2011. ISBN 978-1-4617-3662-2
- Wallace, Patrick; Ó Floinn, Raghnal. Treasures of the National Museum of Ireland: Irish Antiquities. Dublin: National Museum of Ireland, 2002. ISBN 978-0-7171-2829-7
