= Pictish language =

Extinct language in Scotland

Pictish
- Region: Scotland, north of the Forth-Clyde line
- Ethnicity: Picts
- Extinct: by c. 1200 AD
- Language family: Indo-European: Celtic; Insular Celtic; Brittonic/Pritenic?; Pictish
- Writing system: Some scattered instances of Ogham script Some possible instances of Latin script One possible instance of an unknown script

Language codes
- ISO 639-3: xpi
- Glottolog: pict1238

Pictish is an extinct Celtic language that was spoken by the Picts, the people of eastern and northern Scotland from late antiquity to the Early Middle Ages. The language is only attested in several dozen inscriptions in ogham and Latin alphabets, in addition to a limited number of geographical and personal names found on monuments and early medieval records in the area controlled by the kingdoms of the Picts. Available evidence, however, shows the language was Insular Celtic – possibly a variant of Brythonic, once spoken in most of Great Britain, or a distinct branch of Celtic related to it, known as Pritenic.

The prevailing view in the second half of the 20th century was either that Pictish was a non-Indo-European language isolate, or that there coexisted not one but two Pictish languages: one Indo-European (Celtic) and the other non-Indo-European.

Pictish was replaced by – or merged into – Gaelic in the latter centuries of its period. During the reign of Donald II of Scotland (889–900), outsiders began to refer to the region as the Kingdom of Alba rather than the Kingdom of the Picts. However, the Pictish language did not disappear suddenly; a gradual process of Gaelicisation (which may have begun generations earlier) is thought to have been under way during the reigns of Donald II and his successors. By a certain point, probably during the 12th or 13th centuries, all the inhabitants of Alba had become fully Gaelicised Scots, and the Pictish identity was forgotten.

== Classification ==
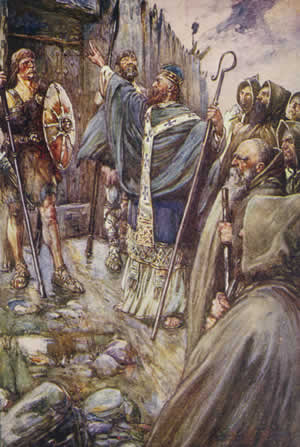
Picture by Joseph Ratcliffe Skelton (1865–1927) depicting Columba preaching to Bridei, king of Fortriu in 565

The existence of a distinct Pictish language during the Early Middle Ages is attested clearly in Bede's early eighth-century Ecclesiastical History of the English People, which names Pictish as a language distinct from those spoken by the Britons, the Irish, and the English. Bede states that Columba, a Gael, used an interpreter on one occasion during his mission to the Picts. A number of competing theories have been advanced regarding the nature of the Pictish language:

- It was a distinct Insular Celtic language from Brittonic branch (together with Welsh, Cornish, Cumbric, and Breton).
- It was a dialect of Common Brittonic or Cumbric, and not a separate language.
- It was an Insular Celtic language allied to the P-Celtic languages, but distinct from Brittonic, having its own branch, known as Pritenic.
- It was an insular Celtic language allied to the Q-Celtic (Goidelic) languages (Irish, Scottish Gaelic, and Manx).
- It was one of the Pre-Indo-European languages left after the Bronze Age, potentially similar to Basque.

Most modern scholars agree that the ancestor of the Pictish language, spoken at the time of the Roman conquest, was a branch of the Brittonic language, while a few scholars accept that it was merely "related" to the Brittonic language. Thomas Charles-Edwards argues that there was a common language in north Britain in the early Roman period, and that the Pictish language developed as a consequence of the emergence of the Pictish confederation in the late third century. Pictish came under increasing influence from the Goidelic language spoken in Dál Riata from the eighth century until its eventual replacement.

Pictish is thought to have influenced the development of modern Scottish Gaelic. This is perhaps most obvious in the contribution of loanwords, but, more importantly, Pictish is thought to have influenced the syntax of Scottish Gaelic, which bears a greater similarity to those of the Brittonic languages than it does to that of Irish.

Some commentators have noted that, in light of the disparate nature of the surviving evidence and large geographical area in which it was spoken, that Pictish may have represented not a single language, but rather a number of discrete Brittonic varieties.

=== Position within Celtic ===
The evidence of place names and personal names demonstrates that an insular Celtic language related to the more southerly Brittonic languages was formerly spoken in the Pictish area. The view of Pictish as a P-Celtic language was first proposed in 1582 by George Buchanan, who aligned the language with Gaulish. A compatible view was advanced by antiquarian George Chalmers in the early 19th century. Chalmers considered that Pictish and Brittonic were one and the same, basing his argument on P-Celtic orthography in the Pictish king lists and in place names predominant in historically Pictish areas.

Although demonstrably Celtic-speaking, the exact linguistic affinity of the Roman-era predecessors to the Picts is difficult to securely establish. The personal name Vepogeni, recorded c. 230 AD, implies that P-Celtic was spoken by at least the Caledonians.

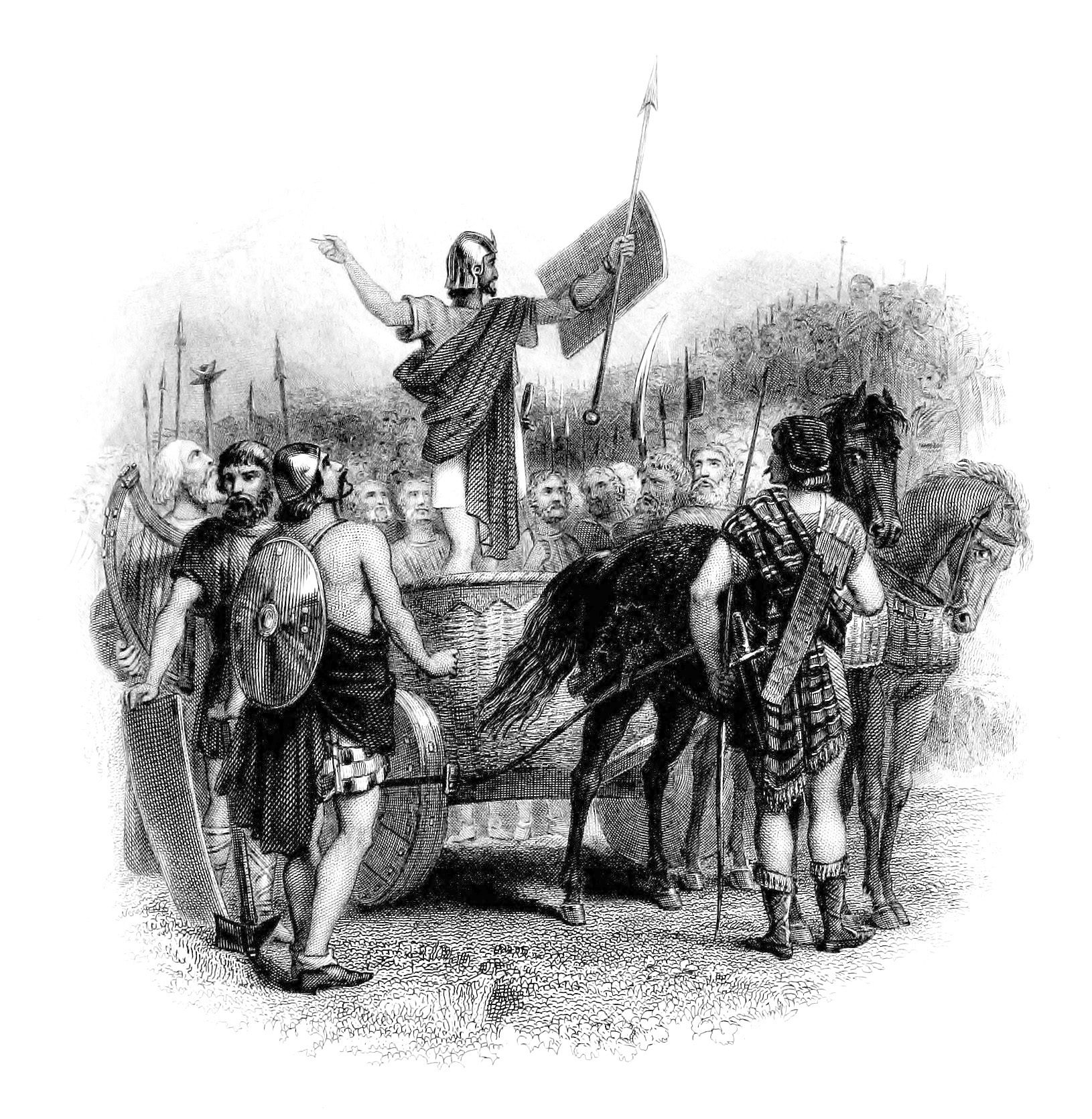
Personal names of Roman-era chieftains from the Pictish area, including Calgacus (above) have a Celtic origin.

Celtic scholar Whitley Stokes, in a philological study of the Irish annals, concluded that Pictish was closely related to Welsh. This conclusion was supported by philologist Alexander MacBain's analysis of the place and tribe names in Ptolemy's second-century Geographia. Toponymist William Watson's exhaustive review of Scottish place names demonstrated convincingly the existence of a dominant P-Celtic language in historically Pictish areas, concluding that the Pictish language was a northern extension of British and that Gaelic was a later introduction from Ireland.

William Forbes Skene argued in 1837 that Pictish was a Goidelic language, the ancestor of modern Scottish Gaelic. He suggested that Columba's use of an interpreter reflected his preaching to the Picts in Latin, rather than any difference between the Irish and Pictish languages. This view, involving independent settlement of Ireland and Scotland by Goidelic people, obviated an Irish influence in the development of Gaelic Scotland and enjoyed wide popular acceptance in 19th-century Scotland.

Skene later revised his view of Pictish, noting that it appeared to share elements of both Goidelic and Brittonic:

It has been too much narrowed by the assumption that, if it is shewn to be a Celtic dialect, it must of necessity be absolutely identic in all its features either with Welsh or with Gaelic. But this necessity does not really exist; and the result I come to is, that it is not Welsh, neither is it Gaelic; but it is a Gaelic dialect partaking largely of Welsh forms.

The Picts were under increasing political, social, and linguistic influence from Dál Riata from around the eighth century. The Picts were steadily gaelicised through the latter centuries of the Pictish kingdom, and by the time of the merging of the Pictish and Dál Riatan kingdoms, the Picts were essentially a Gaelic-speaking people. Forsyth speculates that a period of bilingualism may have outlasted the Pictish kingdom in peripheral areas by several generations. Scottish Gaelic, unlike Irish, maintains a substantial corpus of Brittonic loan-words and, moreover, uses a verbal system modelled on the same pattern as Welsh.

Conversely, when discussing place-names, Watson (1926) eschewed the terms "Pictish" and "Cumbric" in favour of "British" and W. F. H. Nicolaisen (1976) grouped Cumbric and Pictish names together, implying merely dialectal distinction. Neil Whalley (2021) also referred to the two collectively as "Northern Brittonic". Guto Rhys (2015) claimed that the majority of proposals that Pictish diverged from Brittonic at an early date were spurious, and argued for significant co-evolution.

The traditional Q-Celtic vs P-Celtic model, involving separate migrations of P-Celtic and Q-Celtic speaking settlers into the British Isles, is one of mutual unintelligibility, with the Irish Sea serving as the frontier between the two. However, it is likely that the Insular Celtic languages evolved from a more-or-less unified proto-Celtic language within the British Isles. Divergence between P-Celtic Pictish and Q-Celtic Dalriadan Goidelic was slight enough to allow Picts and Dalriadans to understand each other's language to some degree. Under this scenario, a gradual linguistic convergence is conceivable and even probable given the presence of the Columban Church in Pictland.

=== Pritenic hypothesis ===
Many scholars agreed on the idea of Pritenic language - a separate branch of P-Celtic that later evolved into Pictish, aligned but distinct from Brittonic, with significant pre-Celtic component, separating possibly as early as 1st century AD. Initially proposed by Kenneth Jackson, it was supported by scholars like Koch and Alan James as a "helpful term to refer to distinctive features of northernmost parts of Britain", with evidences being largely centred around the Ptolemaic map and sound changes like o-grade, where /e/ shifts to /o/. Later, the theory was heavily criticised by Guto Rhys, who stated that all proofs were incorrect or little importance. Despite this, Pritenic hypothesis still remains visibly popular among scholars.

=== Pre-Indo-European hypothesis ===
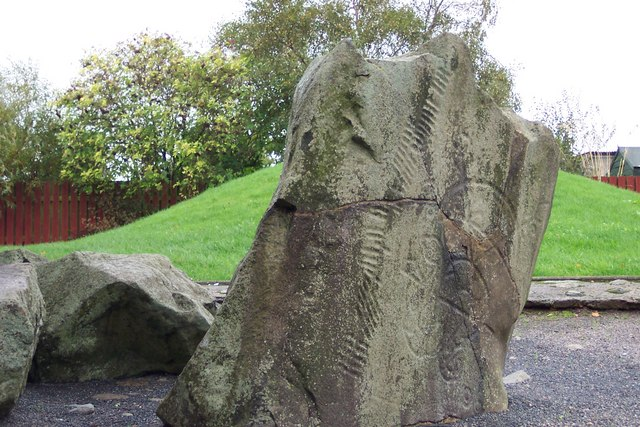
Difficulties in translation of ogham inscriptions, like those found on the Brandsbutt Stone, led to a widely held belief that Pictish was a non-Indo-European language.

In 1892, the Welsh scholar John Rhŷs proposed that Pictish was a non-Indo-European language. This opinion was based on the apparently unintelligible ogham inscriptions found in historically Pictish areas (compare Ogham inscription § Scholastic inscriptions). A similar position was taken by Heinrich Zimmer, who argued that the Picts' supposedly exotic cultural practices (tattooing and matriliny) were equally non-Indo-European, and a pre-Indo-European model was maintained by some well into the 20th century.

A modified version of this theory was advanced in an influential 1955 review of Pictish by Kenneth Jackson, who proposed a two-language model: while Pictish was undoubtedly P-Celtic ( evolving from Pritenic), it may have had a non-Celtic substratum and a second language may have been used for inscriptions. Jackson's hypothesis was framed in the then-current model that a Brittonic elite, identified as the Broch-builders, had migrated from the south of Britain into Pictish territory, dominating a pre-Celtic majority. He used this to reconcile the perceived translational difficulties of Ogham with the overwhelming evidence for a P-Celtic Pictish language. Jackson was content to write off Ogham inscriptions as inherently unintelligible.

Jackson's model became the orthodox position for the latter half of the 20th century. However, it became progressively undermined by advances in understanding of late Iron Age archaeology. Celtic interpretations have been suggested for a number of Ogham inscriptions in recent years, though this remains a matter of debate.

=== Other discredited theories ===
Traditional accounts, now rejected, claimed that the Picts had migrated to Scotland from Scythia, a region that encompassed Eastern Europe and Central Asia. Buchanan, looking for a Scythian P-Celtic candidate for the ancestral Pict, settled on the Gaulish-speaking Cotini (which he rendered as Gothuni), a tribe from the region that is now Slovakia. This was later misunderstood by Robert Sibbald in 1710, who equated Gothuni with the Germanic-speaking Goths. John Pinkerton expanded on this in 1789, claiming that Pictish was the predecessor to modern Scots. Pinkerton's arguments were often rambling, bizarre and clearly motivated by his belief that Celts were an inferior people. The theory of a Germanic Pictish language is no longer considered credible. Theo Vennemann (1997, 1999), as part of his unproven and widely rejected Atlantic languages theory, which proposes that speakers of Semitic languages occupied western Europe before the arrival of Indo-European, suggested that Pictish was a survivor of this supposed language group. On the basis of the conflicting evidence of Brittonic toponymy and apparently non-Celtic Ogham inscriptions, Bernard Mees argued for an Indo-European (but not Celtic) language with influence from Brittonic onomastics.

== Attestations ==
=== Ogham inscriptions ===
Although the interpretation of over 40 Ogham inscriptions remains uncertain, several have been acknowledged to contain Brittonic forms, although Rodway (2020) has disputed this, arguing that most "Celtic" items found within the texts are chance resemblances. Guto Rhys (2015) notes that significant caution is required in the interpretation of such inscriptions because crucial information, such as the orthographic key, the linguistic context in which they were composed and the extent of literacy in Pictland, remains unknown.

An Ogham inscription at the Broch of Burrian, Orkney has been transliterated as I[-]IRANNURRACTX EVVCXRROCCS. Broken up as I[-]irann uract cheuc chrocs, this may reveal a Pictish cognate of Old Welsh guract 'he/she made' in *uract. (The only direct continuation in Middle Welsh is 1sg. gwreith < *u̯rakt-ū in the poem known as "Peis Dinogat" in the Book of Aneirin; this form was eventually reformed to gwnaeth.) With the fourth word explained as spirantized Pictish *crocs 'cross' (Welsh croes < Latin crux) and the corrupted first word a personal name, the inscription may represent a Pictish sentence explaining who carved the cross.

The Shetland inscriptions at Cunningsburgh and Lunnasting reading EHTECONMORS and [E]TTECUHETTS have been understood as Brittonic expressions meaning "this is as great" and "this is as far", respectively, messages appropriate for boundary stones.

Transliterated as IRATADDOARENS, it is possible that the Brandsbutt Stone inscription attests a Pictish form cognate with Old Breton irha-, "he lies", in IRA-, occurring at the Lomarec inscription in Brittany.

A few items occur repeatedly throughout the Ogham corpus. ETTE and similar forms appear on Cunningsburgh, Gurness and Inchyra Oghams, as well as on the non-Ogham Drosten Stone and unknown script of Newton Stone. It has been suggested (Koch, Forsyth 1996) that this is a "Pictish copula + pronoun con-struction" (it-é, is-é), possibly meaning "this is".

=== Place names ===
Pictish toponyms occur in Scotland north of the River Forth. Distributed from Fife to the Isle of Skye, they are relatively abundant south of the Dornoch Firth but rare in the extreme north.

Many principal settlements and geographical features of the region bear names of Pictish origin, including:

- Aberdeen, Aberdeenshire. Meaning 'mouth of the River Don' (cf. Welsh aber, "estuary, confluence").
- Cupar, Fife. Meaning 'confluence' (cf. Welsh cymer).
- Keith, Banffshire. Meaning 'forest' (cf. Welsh coed).
- Kirkcaldy, Fife. Meaning 'place of the hard fort' from caer, 'fort' and caled 'hard'.
- Perth, Perthshire. Meaning 'wood, grove' (cf. Welsh perth).
- Yell, Shetland. Meaning 'unfruitful land' (cf. Welsh iâl).

Several Pictish elements occur multiple times in the region. This table lists selected instances according to the Welsh equivalent.

Element (Welsh)	Meaning	Place names	Reconstructed Pictish form
aber	estuary, confluence	Aberdeen, Abernethy, Aberfeldy, Aberlemno, Aberlour, Abercorn, Lochaber	*abor
bryn	hill	Burnbane, Burnturk, Cameron (Markinch), Cameron (St Andrews), Newburn, Strathburn	*brinn
caer	fort, stronghold; wall, rampart	Cardean, Carey, Cargill, Carmurie, Carpow, Carpoway, Crail, Kair, Keir, Kercock, Kirkbuddo, Kirkcaldy	*cair
coed	trees, forest, wood	Catochil, Erchite, Inchkeith, Keith, Keith Lundie, Keithack, Keithick, Keithmore, Keithny, Keithney, Keithock, Kitattie, Rothket	*kɛd
dôl	field, meadow	Dalfouper, Dallas, Dallasbraughty, Doll, Dollar, Dull	*dol
llannerch	clearing, glade	Landrick, Lanrick, Lendrick	*lanerch
mig(n)	swamp, quagmire	Dalmigavie, Meckphen, Meigle, Megen, Megevie, Meggen, Meggernie, Midmar, Midstrath, Migdale, Migger, Migvie, Strathmiglo	*mig
pant	hollow	Panbride, Panholes, Panlathy, Panmure, ?Pannanich	*pant
pen	head; top, summit; source of stream; headland; chief, principal	Pandewen, Pennan, Pinderachy, Pinnel	*pen
tref	town, homestead, estate, township	Cantray, Cantress, Menstrie, Montrave, Rattray (Blairgowrie), Rattray (Buchan), Tramaud, Trefor, Trefynie, Trostrie, Troustrie	*trev
rhudd	red	Ruthven, Rothket, Rothmaise, Rothie	*rouð

Some Pictish names have been succeeded by Gaelic forms, and in certain instances the earlier forms appear on historical record.

- Inverbervie, Kincardineshire. Haberberui in 1290, demonstrates that a Pictish aber, "estuary, confluence" has been supplanted by Gaelic inbhir, with identical meaning.
- Inverie, Fife. A possible early form, Auerin (1141), may be for *Aberin, thus attesting the same inbhir for aber substitution as above.
- Kindrochit Alian, Aberdeenshire. Doldauha before c. 850 AD, in which the first element is dôl ("meadow").
- Kinneil, West Lothian. Immediately south of Pictish territory, according to Bede known as Peanfahel or Peanuahel (731 AD) in Pictish, showing substitution of *pen ("head, summit") for the Gaelic cognate cenn.
- Strathtyrum, Fife. Trestirum in 1190, suggestive of assimilation of a Pictish tref, "estate", to (unrelated) Gaelic srath, "a valley".

It is possible that more apparently Gaelic-derived place-names have Pictish origins. Pictish elements in some names may have been widely adapted with their Gaelic cognates, creating the appearance of a name coined from scratch in Gaelic.

=== Personal names ===
Pictish personal names, as acquired from documents such as the Poppleton manuscript, show significant diagnostically Brittonic features including the retention of final -st and initial w- (cf. P. Uurgust vs. Goidelic Fergus) as well as development of -ora- to -ara- (cf. P. Taran vs G. torann).

Several Pictish names are directly parallel to names and nouns in Brittonic languages. Several Pictish names are listed below according to their equivalents in Brittonic and other Celtic languages.

Pictish	Brittonic cognate(s)	Other Celtic cognate(s)
Mailcon	Mailcon (Old Welsh), Maelgwn (Welsh)	Máelchú (O. Irish)
Morcunt, Morgunn, Morgainn	Morcant (Old Welsh)	Morgán, Morgunn (Gaelic)
Taran	taran (Welsh)	torann (Gaelic), Taranis (Gaulish)
Unust	Unwst (Welsh)	Oengus (Gaelic)
Uoret, Urad	Guoret (Old Welsh)	Ferat (Gaelic)
Uuen (Latinised)	Owain (Welsh)	Eògan (O. Irish)
Uurgust	Gurgust (Old Welsh)	Fearghas (Gaelic)

Several elements common in forming Brittonic names also appear in the names of Picts. These include *jʉð, "lord" (> Ciniod) and *res, "ardor" (> Resad; cf. Welsh Rhys).

=== Irish records ===
The 9th century work Sanas Cormaic (or Cormac's Glossary), an etymological glossary of Irish, noted a word catait ("Pictish brooch") (also spelled cartait and catit) as being of Pictish origin. Isaac (2005) compared the word with Old Welsh cathet (of uncertain meaning but thought to mean 'brooch' and appearing in a 10th century poem listing precious gifts) and offered a speculative Pictish reconstruction *kazdet.

== Influence on Gaelic languages ==
Etymological investigation of the Scottish Gaelic language, in particular the 1896 efforts of Alexander Macbain, has demonstrated the presence of a corpus of Pictish loanwords in the language. The items most commonly cited as loanwords are bad ('clump'; Breton bod), bagaid ('cluster, troop'; Welsh (W) bagad), dail ('meadow'; W dôl), dìleab 'legacy', monadh ('moor, mountain'; W mynydd), mormaer ('earl'; W mawr + maer), pailt ('plentiful'; Cornish pals), peasg ('gash'; W pisg), peit ('area of ground, part, share'; W peth), pòr (Middle Welsh paur; 'grain, crops'), preas ('bush'; W prys). On the basis of a number of the loans attesting shorter vowels than other British cognates, linguist Guto Rhys proposed Pictish resisted some Latin-influenced sound changes of the 6th century. Rhys has also noted the potentially "fiscal" profile of several of the loans, and hypothesized that they could have entered Gaelic as a package in a governmental context.

Several Gaelic nouns have meanings more closely matching their Brittonic cognates than those in Irish, indicating that Pictish may have influenced the sense and usage of these words as a substrate. Srath (> Strath-) is recorded to have meant 'grassland' in Old Irish, whereas the modern Gaelic realization means 'broad valley', exactly as in its Brittonic cognates (cf. Welsh ystrad). Dùn, foithir, lios, ràth and tom may, by the same token, attest a substrate influence from Pictish.

Greene noted that the verbal system inherited in Gaelic from Old Irish had been brought "into complete conformity with that of modern spoken Welsh", and consequently Guto Rhys adjudged that Pictish may have modified Gaelic verbal syntax. The syntactic influences proposed by Greene include:

- Lost present tense. Unlike modern Irish, spoken Scottish Gaelic abandoned the present tense inherited from Old Irish. In Scottish Gaelic, as in modern Welsh, the inherited present tense carries a largely future meaning.
- The periphrastic present. To express habitual present tense, Scottish Gaelic, unlike standard Irish, uses a present tense form of the verb "to be" + the particle aig ("at") + a verbal noun. Breton, Cornish and Welsh all form the habitual present tense similarly. As illustrated by the sentence "the man eats often":

Irish: Itheann an fear go minic. (lit. "eats the man often").
Scottish Gaelic: Bidh an duine ag ithe gu tric. (lit. "is the man at eating often").
Welsh: Mae'r dyn yn bwyta'n aml. (lit. "is the man in eating often").

== Sources ==
- Armit, Ian (1990), Beyond the Brochs: Changing Perspectives on the Atlantic Scottish Iron Age, Edinburgh University Press
- Armit, Ian (2002), Towers of the North: The Brochs of Scotland, Cheltenham: History Press
- Bannerman, John (1999), Broun, Dauvit; Clancy, Thomas Owen (eds.), "The Scottish Takeover of Pictland and the relics of Columba", Spes Scotorum: Hope of Scots: Saint Columba, Iona and Scotland, Edinburgh: T.& T. Clark
- Bede (1910), Ecclesiastical History of England Book 1 – via sourcebooks.fordham.edu
- Broun, Dauvit (1997), "Dunkeld and the origin of Scottish Identity", The Innes Review, 48 (2): 112–124, doi:10.3366/inr.1997.48.2.112
- Broun, Dauvit (2001), Lynch, Michael (ed.), "National identity: Early medieval and the formation of Alba", The Oxford Companion to Scottish History, Oxford: Oxford University Press, p. 437
- Campbell, Ewan (2001), "Were the Scots Irish?", Antiquity, 75 (288): 285–292, doi:10.1017/s0003598x00060920
- Chalmers, George (1807). Caledonia: or a historical and topographical account of North Britain, from the most ancient to the present times with a dictionary of places chorographical and philological. Vol. 1 (new ed.). Paisley: Alex. Gardner.
- Charles-Edwards, Thomas (2013). Wales and the Britons 350–1064. Oxford, UK: Oxford University Press. ISBN 978-0-19-821731-2.
- Cowan, E. J. (2000), "The invention of Celtic Scotland", in Cowan, E. J.; McDonald, R. A. (eds.), Alba: Celtic Scotland in the Medieval Era, East Linton, Scotland: Tuckwell Press, pp. 1–23
- Ferguson, William (1991), "George Buchanan and the Picts", Scottish Tradition, vol. XVI, pp. 18–32
- Forsyth, Katherine (1995a), "Language in Pictland: Spoken and written", in Nicoll, E. H.; Forsyth, K. (eds.), A Pictish Panorama: The Story of the Picts, Brechin, Scotland: Pinkfoot Press, pp. 7–10, ISBN 9781874012108
- Forsyth, Katherine (1997), Language in Pictland: The Case Against 'Non-Indo-European Pictish' (PDF), Utrecht: de Keltische Draak, ISBN 978-90-802785-5-4
- Forsyth, Katherine (1998), "Literacy in Pictish", in Pryce, H. (ed.), Literacy in medieval Celtic societies (PDF), Cambridge: Cambridge University Press
- Forsyth, Katherine (2005), Wormald, J. (ed.), "Origins: Scotland to 1100", Scotland: a History, Oxford University Press
- Forsyth, Katherine (2006), "Pictish Language and Documents", in Koch, John T. (ed.), Celtic Culture: A Historical Encyclopedia, vol. 1: Aberdeen breviary - Celticism, Santa Barbara, California: ABC-CLIO
- Fraser, J. (1923), History and etymology : an inaugural lecture delivered before the University of Oxford on 3 March 1923, Oxford: Clarendon Press
- Fraser, James E. (2009), From Caledonia to Pictland: Scotland to 795, "The New Edinburgh History of Scotland" series, vol. 1, Edinburgh University Press
- Greene, D. (1966), "The Making of Insular Celtic", Proceedings of the Second International Congress of Celtic Studies, Cardiff: University of Wales Press, pp. 123–136
- Greene, David (1994), Thomson, Derick S. (ed.), "Gaelic: syntax, similarities with British syntax", The Companion to Gaelic Scotland, Glasgow: Gairm, pp. 107–108
- Jackson, K. (1955), "The Pictish Language", in Wainwright, F. T. (ed.), The Problem of the Picts, Edinburgh: Nelson, pp. 129–166
- Koch, John T. (1983), "The Loss of Final Syllables and Loss of Declension in Brittonic", The Bulletin of the Board of Celtic Studies, vol. XXX, University of Wales Press
- Koch, John T. (2006a), "Insular Celtic", in Koch, John T. (ed.), Celtic Culture: A Historical Encyclopedia, Santa Barbara, California: ABC-CLIO, pp. 973–974
- Koch, John T., ed. (2006). Celtic Culture: A Historical Encyclopedia. Vol. 1: Aberdeen breviary - Celticism. Santa Barbara, California: ABC-CLIO. ISBN 9781851094400.
- Macalister, R. A. S. (1940), "The Inscriptions and Language of the Picts", in Ryan, J (ed.), Essays and Studies Presented to Professor Eoin MacNeill (Feil-Sgribhinn Edin mhic Neill), Dublin: At the Sign of the Three Candles, pp. 184–226
- MacBain, Alexander (1892), "Ptolemy's geography of Scotland", Transactions of the Gaelic Society of Inverness, vol. 18, pp. 267–288
- MacNeill, E. (1939), "The Language of the Picts", Yorkshire Celtic Studies, 2: 3–45
- Piggot, S. (1955), "The Archaeological Background", in Wainwright, F. T. (ed.), The Problem of the Picts, Edinburgh: Nelson, pp. 54–65
- Pinkerton, John (1789), An enquiry into the history of Scotland: preceding the reign of Malcolm III or the year 1056 including the authentic history of that period (new (1814) ed.), Edinburgh: James Ballantyne and co.
- Price, G. (2000), Languages in Britain and Ireland, Oxford: Blackwell, ISBN 9780631215813
- Rhys, J. (1892), "The Inscriptions and Language of the Northern Picts" (PDF), Proceedings of the Society of Antiquaries of Scotland, 26: 263–351, doi:10.9750/PSAS.026.263.351
- Rhys, J. (1898), "A Revised Account of the Inscriptions of the Northern Picts" (PDF), Proceedings of the Society of Antiquaries of Scotland, 32: 324–398, doi:10.9750/PSAS.032.324.398, S2CID 195478379
- Rodway, Simon (2020), "The Ogham Inscriptions of Scotland and Brittonic Pictish" (PDF), Journal of Celtic Linguistics, 21: 173–234, doi:10.16922/jcl.21.6, S2CID 164499595
- Servius, Servii Grammatici in Vergilii Aeneidos Librum Quartum Commentarius
- Sibbald, Robert (1710), The history, ancient and modern, of the Sheriffdoms of Fife and Kinross.
- Skene, W. F. (1837), The Highlanders of Scotland, their origin, history and antiquities; with a sketch of their manners and customs and an account of the clans into which they were divided and the state of society which existed among them, vol. 1, London: John Murray
- Skene, William Forbes (1868), The Four Ancient Books of Wales, Abela Publishing, ISBN 9781907256929
- Smyth, Alfred P. (1984), "Warlords and Holy Men", New History of Scotland, Edinburgh: Edward Arnold (Publishers)
- Stokes, W. (1890), "On the Linguistic Value of the Irish Annals", Transactions of the Philological Society, 21: 365–433, doi:10.1111/j.1467-968x.1990.tb01251.x
- Virgil, Aeneid
- Watson, W. J. (1926), Celtic Place Names of Scotland, Birlinn
- Woolf, Alex (1998), "Pictish matriliny reconsidered", The Innes Review, 49 (2): 147–167, doi:10.3366/inr.1998.49.2.147
- Woolf, Alex (2001), Lynch, Michael (ed.), "Constantine II", The Oxford Companion to Scottish History, Oxford: Oxford University Press, p. 106
- Woolf, Alex (2007), "From Pictland to Alba 789–1070", The New Edinburgh History of Scotland, vol. 2, Edinburgh University Press
- Zimmer, H. (1898), "Matriarchy among the Picts", in Henderson, G. (ed.), Leabhar nan Gleann, Edinburgh: Norman Macleod

=== Further reading ===
- Jackson, Kenneth (1977), "The Ogham inscription on the spindle whorl from Buckquoy, Orkney" (PDF), Proceedings of the Society of Antiquaries of Scotland, 108: 221–222
- Forsyth, Katherine (1996), "The ogham-inscribed spindle whorl from Buckquoy: Evidence for the Irish language in pre-Viking Orkney?" (PDF), Proceedings of the Society of Antiquaries of Scotland, 125: 677–696, doi:10.9750/PSAS.125.677.696, S2CID 202616596
- Nicolaisen, W. F. H. (2001), Scottish Place-Names, Edinburgh: John Donald
- Okasha, E. (1985), "The Non-Ogam Inscriptions of Pictland", Cambridge Medieval Celtic Studies, 9: 43–69
