= Anna Ritchie (archaeologist) =

British archaeologist (1943–2026)

Anna Ritchie OBE FSA
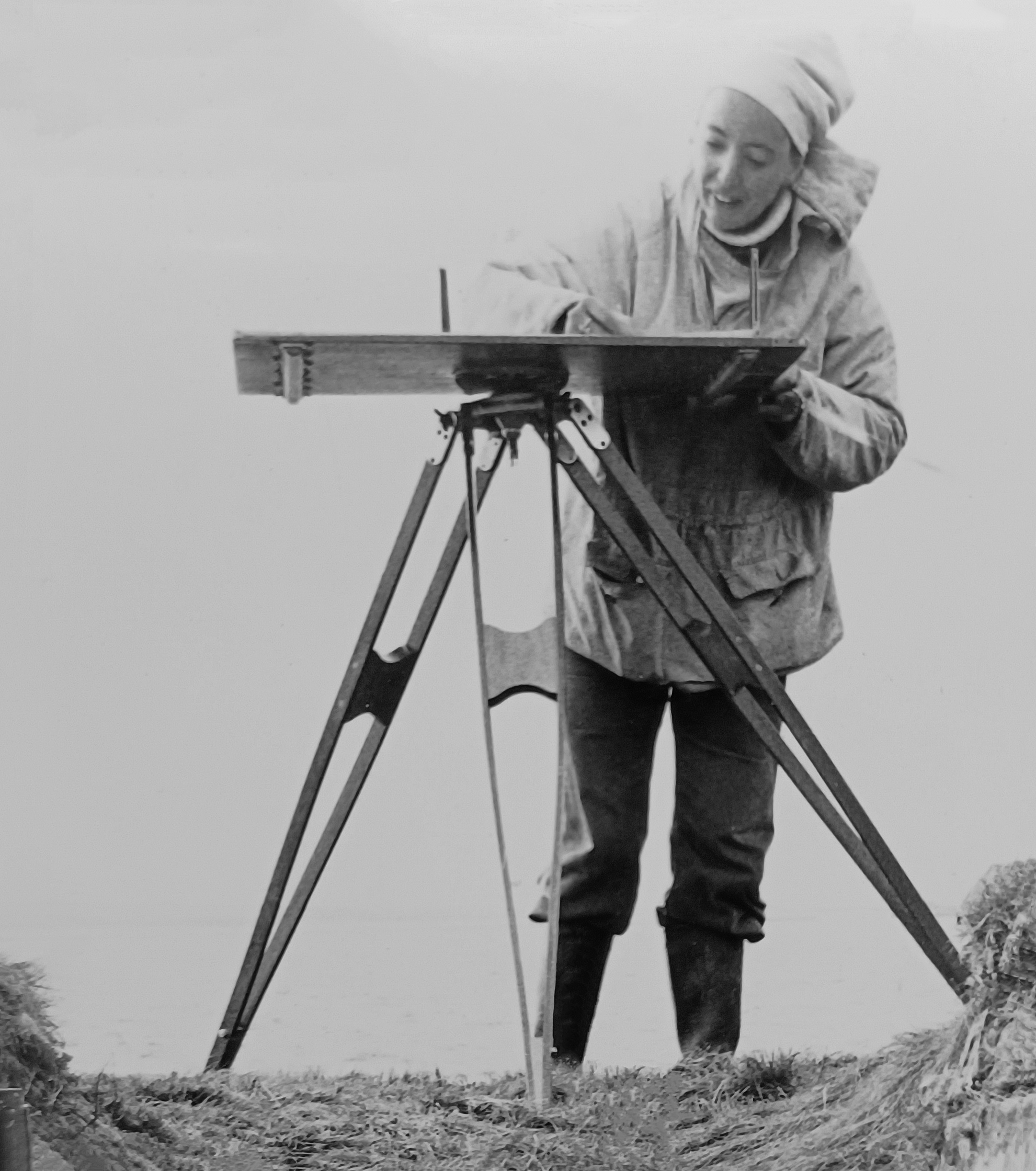
- Anna Ritchie planning at the Knap of Howar excavations in Papa Westray, Orkney, in 1973
- Born: 28 September 1943
- Died: 8 May 2026 (aged 82)
- Occupation: Archaeologist
- Spouse: Graham Ritchie (m. 1968)

Academic background
- Education: Cardiff University (BA); University of Edinburgh (PhD)
- Thesis: Settlements and economy in Britain during the first millennium B.C. (1970)

Academic work
- Discipline: Archaeology

Anna Ritchie Hon FSA Scot OBE (née Bachelier; 28 September 1943 – 8 May 2026) was a British archaeologist and historian. She is known for her work at archaeological sites in Orkney, and wrote a number of guidebooks for the HMSO and Historic Environment Scotland about Scottish history and historical sites. She was the first female president of the Society of Antiquaries of Scotland from 1990 to 1993 and an Honorary Fellow of the Society.

== Early life and education ==
Ritchie was born Anna Bachelier in Putney, south-west London, on 28 September 1943, and was raised in Surrey. Her interest in archaeology began as a young student at Woking Girls' Grammar School in the 1950s. The school had a small collection of Roman and Egyptian artefacts which the young Anna curated, catalogued and redisplayed. In an interview with the Egypt Centre at Swansea University, she recalled, "The artefacts were displayed in a shelved case in the main entrance hall of the school, and I loved looking after them. You are right in thinking that I compiled the first inventory, and indeed that the museum was a spur to my future as an archaeologist." She received her BA from Cardiff University (where her undergraduate dissertation was on the "Linear Earthworks of Wessex", studying with Richard J. C. Atkinson) and then moved to the University of Edinburgh to study with Stuart Piggott. The title of her doctoral thesis (1970) was "Settlements and Economy in Britain during the first millennium B.C."

== Career ==
Beginning her career in the late 1960s, she researched and published widely in academic and popular publications. In 1968, she married fellow archaeologist J N Graham Ritchie (died 2005) and the couple had two children. She and her husband (who worked for RCAHMS) often collaborated on fieldwork, research and writing projects, including Scotland: Archaeology and Early History (1981), the Oxford Archaeological Guide to Scotland (1998) and The Ancient Monuments of Orkney, published in 1978. Her research, excavations and publications span from the Neolithic of Scotland through to the later first millennium AD, particularly the Picts and early Norse.

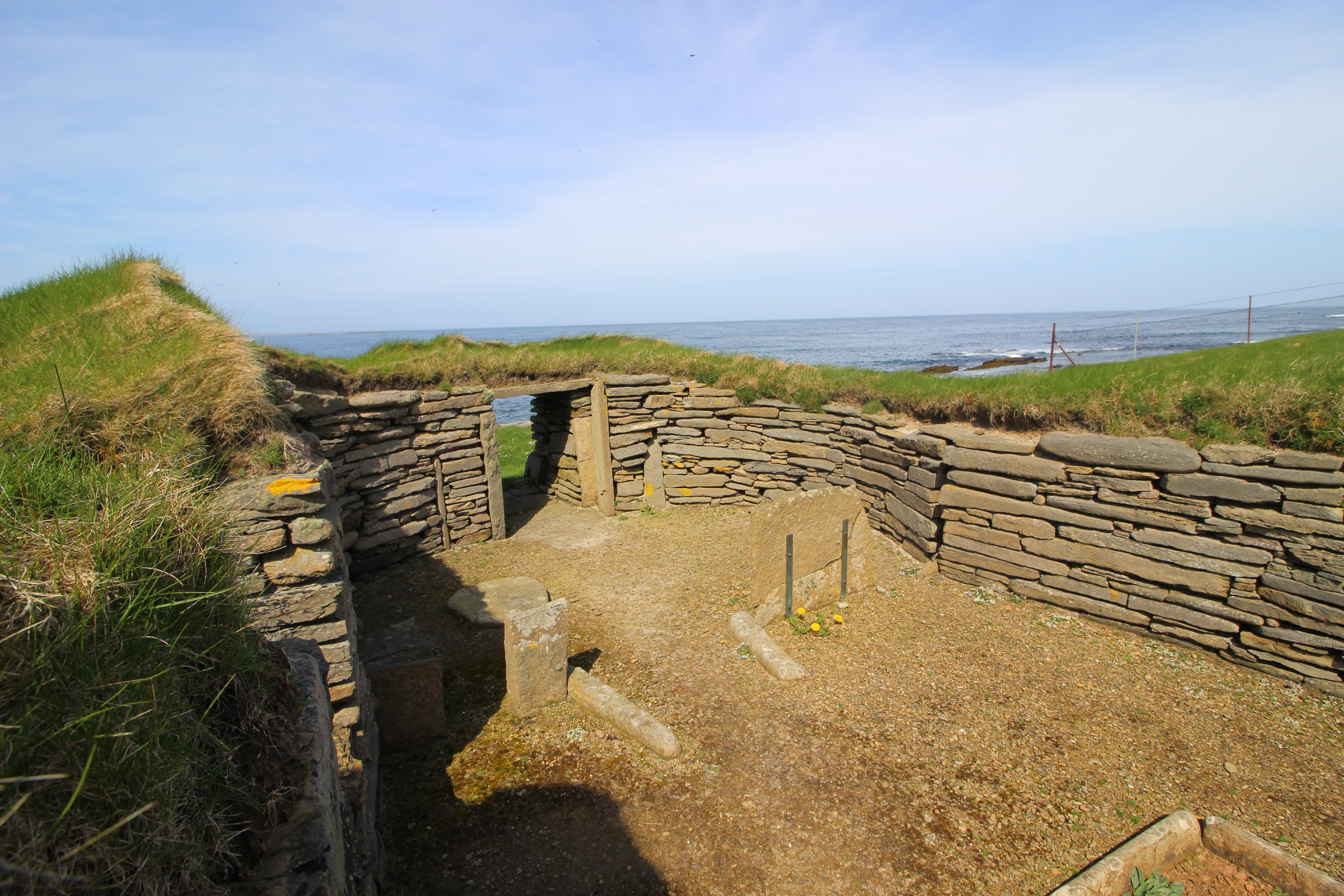
The interior of the second house at the Knap of Howar

In the 1970s she directed three major archaeological excavations in Orkney − the Pictish and Viking farmstead at Buckquoy in Birsay, the Neolithic farmstead of Knap of Howar on Papa Westray and a Neolithic chambered cairn on the Holm of Papa Westray. All three were ground-breaking for our understanding of these sites.

Her excavations at Buckquoy lasted for ten weeks over the summers of 1970 and 1971. Other archaeologists working on the excavations included Isla MacInnes, Ian Ralston, Ian Shepherd, Alexandra (Lekky) Tuckwell (later Shepherd) and Arthur MacGregor. The site is celebrated for the sequence of Pictish buildings, with Anna reinterpreting the results over thirty years later. One of the key finds from the site, the Buckquoy spindle-whorl, inspired a collection of jewellery by notable Orkney Jeweller Sheila Fleet.

Ritchie subsequently co-directed the excavations at Skara Brae with David Clarke in 1972 and 1973, moving at the end of the 1973 season to excavate at Knap of Howar, commissioned by the Department of the Environment ahead of conservation, returning in 1975; the site is in guardianship and open to the public. The research questions from this excavation stimulated her subsequent excavations at the Holm of Papa Westray in 1982 and 1983. In the post-excavation work on these excavations she worked closely with Alison Sheridan, publishing the results many years later due to the challenges of post-excavation funding.

For most of her career she worked as a freelance archaeologist, although she held a temporary lectureship in archaeology at Edinburgh in 1972. As well as publishing widely in academic journals and books, Ritchie has also written extensively for more popular publications. She has authored numerous guidebooks and publications for the HMSO and Historic Environment Scotland, covering topics such as Scottish Prehistory, Picts, Vikings, early Medieval sculpture and place-focused works on the archaeology of Iona, Orkney, Shetland, and Bute. She was a panellist on a 1971 episode of the television show Animal, Vegetable, Mineral, discussing the Viking Age. She has also acted as a consultant for the television series Time Team and Blood of the Vikings.

She was the first woman president of the Society of Antiquaries of Scotland (1990–93) of which she was an Honorary Fellow; she was also Vice-President of the Society of Antiquaries (London) and received an OBE for her services to archaeology in 1997. She has served as a trustee of the National Museum of Scotland and the British Museum, and has been a long-standing supporter of heritage organisations the SCAPE Trust, Groam House Museum and The Govan Stones. She has served as a director for the Tarbat Historic Trust, the SCAPE Trust and the Prehistoric Society.

In March 2022 The Scottish Society for Northern Studies and the Pictish Arts Society held a conference in her honour. The papers as delivered at the conference were made available to view online, and its proceedings have since been published as a festschrift.

== Death ==
Ritchie died on 8 May 2026, aged 82.

== Publications ==
=== Selected books ===
Ritchie, J.N.G. & A. (1972). Edinburgh and South East Scotland. Heinemann. ISBN 978-0435329716

Ritchie, A. (1977). The Kingdom of the Picts. Chambers. ISBN 978-0550755346

Ritchie, A. & Ritchie, G. (1978). The Ancient Monuments of Orkney. HMSO ISBN 978-0-11-495734-6

Ritchie, G. & Ritchie, A. (1981). Scotland: Archaeology and History. Thames & Hudson. ISBN 9780748602919

Ritchie, A. (1985). Orkney and Shetland (Exploring Scotland’s Heritage), HMSO. ISBN 978-0114924584

Ritchie, A. (1986). Brough of Birsay, HMSO. ISBN 0-11-493125-9

Ritchie, A. (1988). Scotland BC: An Introduction to the Prehistoric Houses, Tombs, Ceremonial Monuments and Fortifications in the Care of the Secretary of State for Scotland. HMSO. ISBN 978-0114934279

Ritchie, A. (1989). Picts: an introduction to the life of the Picts and the carved stones in the care of the Secretary of State for Scotland. HMSO. ISBN 978-0114934910

Ritchie, A. & Breeze, D. J. (1991). Invaders of Scotland: Introduction to the Archaeology of the Romans, Scots, Angles and Vikings. HMSO. ISBN 978-1900168779

Ritchie, A. (1993). Viking Scotland. Historic Scotland.ISBN 978-0713473162

Ritchie, A. (1993). The Ancient Monuments of Orkney. Historic Scotland. ISBN 978-0114957346

Ritchie, A. (ed) (1994). Govan and its early medieval sculpture. Sutton. ISBN 978-0750907170

Ritchie, A. (1994). Perceptions of the Picts: from Eumenius to John Buchan. Groam House Museum Trust. ISBN 978-0951577844

Ritchie, A. (1995). Prehistoric Orkney. Historic Scotland/Batsford. ISBN 9780713475937

Ritchie, A. (1996). Orkney (Exploring Scotland’s Heritage). HMSO. ISBN 978-0114952884

Ritchie, A. (1997). Iona. Historic Scotland. ISBN 978-0713478563

Ritchie, A. (1997). Shetland (Exploring Scotland’s Heritage). HMSO. ISBN 978-0114952891

Ritchie, A. (1997). Meigle Museum: Pictish Carved Stones. Historic Scotland. ISBN 978-1900168274

Ritchie, A. & G. (1998). Scotland: An Oxford Archaeological Guide. Oxford University Press. ISBN 978-0192880024

Ritchie, A. (1999). Govan and its carved stones. Pinkfoot Press. ISBN 978-1874012221

Ritchie, A. (ed.) (2000). Neolithic Orkney in its European Context. McDonald Institute Monograph, Cambridge. ISBN 9781902937045

Ritchie, A. & Fisher, I. (2001). Iona Abbey and Nunnery. Historic Scotland. ISBN 9781903570227

Downes, J. & Ritchie A. (eds) (2003). Sea Change: Orkney and Northern Europe in the Later Iron Age AD 300–800. Orkney Heritage Society. ISBN 978-1874012382

Ritchie, A. (2004). Hogback gravestones at Govan and beyond. Friends of Govan Old. ISBN 978-0954532116

Ritchie, A. (ed.) (2005). Kilellan Farm, Ardnave, Islay: Excavations of a prehistoric to early medieval site by Colin Burgess and others 1954–1976 : Kilellan Farm, Ardnave, Islay: Excavations of a prehistoric to early medieval site by Colin Burgess and others 1954–1976. Society of Antiquaries of Scotland. ISBN 9780903903356

Ritchie, A, Scott, I. G. & Gray, T. E. (2006). People of Early Scotland. From Contemporary Images. Pinkfoot Press. ISBN 978-1874012504

Scott, I. G. & Ritchie, A. (2009). Pictish and Viking-Age Carvings from Shetland. RCAHMS. ISBN 978-1902419633

Ritchie, A. (2009). On the Fringe of Neolithic Europe. Society of Antiquaries of Scotland. ISBN 978-0-903903-47-9

Ritchie, A. (2011). A Shetland Antiquarian: James Thomas Irvine of Yell. Shetland Amenity Trust. ISBN 978-0956569844

Ritchie, A. (ed) (2012). Historic Bute: Land and People. Scottish Society for Northern Studies. ISBN 9780953522644

=== Selected papers ===
Ritchie, A. (1977). 'Excavation of Pictish and Viking Age farmsteads at Buckquoy, Orkney'. Proc Soc Antiq Scot 108 (1976–77), 174–227.

Ritchie, A. (1983). 'Excavation of a Neolithic farmstead at Knap of Howar, Papa Westray, Orkney'. Proc Soc Antiq Scot 113 (1983), 40–121.

Ritchie, A. (1985) 'The early settlers' (pp 36–53) and 'Orkney in the Pictish Kingdom' (pp 183–204), in Renfrew, C (ed) The Prehistory of Orkney, 183–204. Edinburgh University Press. ISBN 978-0748602384

Brundle, A. Lorimer, D.H., and Ritchie, A. (2003). 'Buckquoy revisited' in Downes, J. and Ritchie, A. (eds) Sea change: Orkney and Northern Europe in the Later Iron Age AD 300–800. Balgavies: The Pinkfoot Press, 95–104.

A collection of her and her husband's papers and photos have been digitized and are available on Canmore.
