= Springmount Bog Tablets =

7th-8th century wax tablets found in what is now Northern Ireland

Coordinates: 54°57′59″N 6°17′35″W

- National Museum of Ireland – Archaeology
- Type: Psalter
- Date: circa 600
- Place of origin: Ireland
- Language: Vulgar Latin
- Material: wood and wax
- Size: 7.5 × 21.0 cm
- Script: Irish majuscule
- Contents: Psalms 30–32
- Discovered: 1914

The Springmount Bog Tablets are a set of six wooden wax tablets dating to the late 7th or early 8th century that were discovered in 1914 in the Springmount bog near Ballyhutherland, County Antrim, Northern Ireland. The tablets form a booklet with text from the Book of Psalms inscribed on the wax surface of the wooden pages. The tablets are considered to be the earliest surviving example of Irish writing in the Latin script, and were included as no. 25 in a set of 100 items representing A History of Ireland in 100 Objects compiled by The Irish Times, the National Museum of Ireland, and the Royal Irish Academy.

== Discovery ==
The tablets were discovered in 1914 by W. Gregg of Clough, in the Springmount Bog (also known as Ballyhutherland Bog), less than a mile from the village of Clough, and about seven miles north of Ballymena, in County Antrim. Gregg found the tablets about four feet below the surface while cutting peat.

Gregg sold the tablets to the National Museum of Ireland in 1914 (acquisition number S.A. 1914.2), and they are currently held at the National Museum of Ireland – Archaeology on Kildare Street in Dublin, Ireland.

== Description ==
Six tablets made of yew wood are bound together along one edge with a leather thong, and tied shut at the top and bottom with two leather straps. Both sides of the inner four tablets, and the inner sides of the two outer tablets, have been hollowed out and filled with wax to form the writing surfaces of a wooden book of ten pages. Each wooden tablet is about 7.5 × 21.0 cm in size, and about 0.7 cm thick. The wax had partially melted when found, and some of the wax was damaged when the tablets were opened after discovery, but nevertheless much of the text is still legible.

The Vulgate (Latin) text of parts of Psalms 30 through 32 (31–33 in modern numbering) has been inscribed on the wax surface using a stylus. The text is laid out in two columns, except on the first wax page. The letters are written in "Irish majuscule" (also known as Insular half-uncial) script. The Latin text represents Jerome's Gallican version of the Psalms rather than the earlier Old Latin version.

== Date and provenance ==
The tablets have been dated to the late 7th-century on palaeographic evidence, and in 1963 David H. Wright suggested a date of about 600, which has been generally accepted.

It is thought that the tablets came from a monastery near where they were found, and were probably used for teaching literacy and as an aid for memorizing the Psalms.

== See also ==
- Faddan More Psalter, a 9th Century psalter found in a peat bog in 2006
- Cathach of St. Columba, a 7th Century Irish psalter
