= Buckquoy spindle-whorl =

Ancient artifact found in Scotland

Coordinates: 59.1343°N 3.3236°W

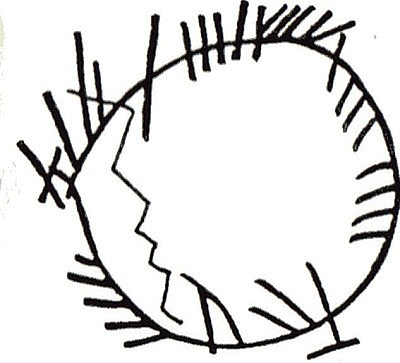
Drawing of the Ogham inscription

The Buckquoy spindle-whorl is an Ogham-inscribed spindle-whorl dating from the Early Middle Ages which was found by Anna Ritchie in 1970 in Buckquoy, Birsay, Orkney, Scotland. It is the only known spindle-whorl with an Ogham inscription.

== Discovery ==
The whorl was found just outside the door of the main hall of a large Pictish house. It was one of six spindle-whorls found at Buckquoy, though none of the others were decorated. Other spindle-whorls made of the similar material have been found in Orkney, so the stone from which the whorl was made is likely to have originated in Orkney and the carving done locally. Ritchie described the discovery of the inscription after it was washed as "one of the most vivid memories of my career".

The dating of the whorl is uncertain. Ritchie thought it probably dated to the 8th century, and perhaps earlier in the century, as it lacked features seen in later Ogham inscriptions in Scotland; historian Katherine Forsyth called this "inherently plausible" but gave bounds of the 7th to early 9th century based on the site where it was found.

It is now on display at the Orkney Museum. A local jewelry designer has made a collection inspired by its inscription.

== Description and interpretation ==
Made of sandy limestone, it is about 36 mm (1.4 in) in diameter and 10 mm (0.39 in) thick, with quartz grains up to 0.5 mm (0.020 in) in diameter. The Ogham characters are arranged along an incised stem line which is, unusually, engraved in a circle. This inscription winds around the central hole of the whorl. Because of the circular nature of the inscription, different authors have read it in different directions and starting at different points.

The inscription was once used as proof that the Pictish language was not Indo-European, being variously read as:

- E(s/n)DDACTA(n/lv)IM(v/lb)
- (e/)(s/n/)DDACTANIMV
- (e/)TMIQAVSALL(e/q)

However, in 1995 Forsyth, reading

- ENDDACTANIM(f/lb)

proposed that the inscription was a standard Old Irish Ogham benedictory message, Benddact anim L. meaning "a blessing on the soul of L.".

Simon Rodway, in 2017, gave a different interpretation, reading it as "T'ANIM VENDDAC" or something like "from dear Venddac [Findach]", with Venddac being the personal name of a man who gave the spindle-whorl to a woman as a gift. Although the Buckquoy spindle-whorl is the only one known with an Ogham inscription, there are other known examples of inscribed spindle-whorls that are thought to have been gifts from men to women.

== See also ==
- Epigraphy
- Ogham inscription
