= Culsalmond =

16th-century castle in Scotland

Coordinates: 57.3567°N 2.5635°W

Culsalmond was a 16th-century castle about 9.5 miles (15.3 km) south east of Huntly, Aberdeenshire, Scotland, near the river Ury.

== History ==
The castle is thought to have been a property of the Gordons. The view that it existed by 1591 but was unroofed in 1594 is disputed.

== Structure ==
The property may have been at the site of Newton House, a house with four stories and an attic, which dates from the late 17th century. However, there is no trace of remains.

== See also ==
- Castles in Great Britain and Ireland
- List of castles in Scotland
