= Rodney's Stone =

Pictish standing stone in Scotland

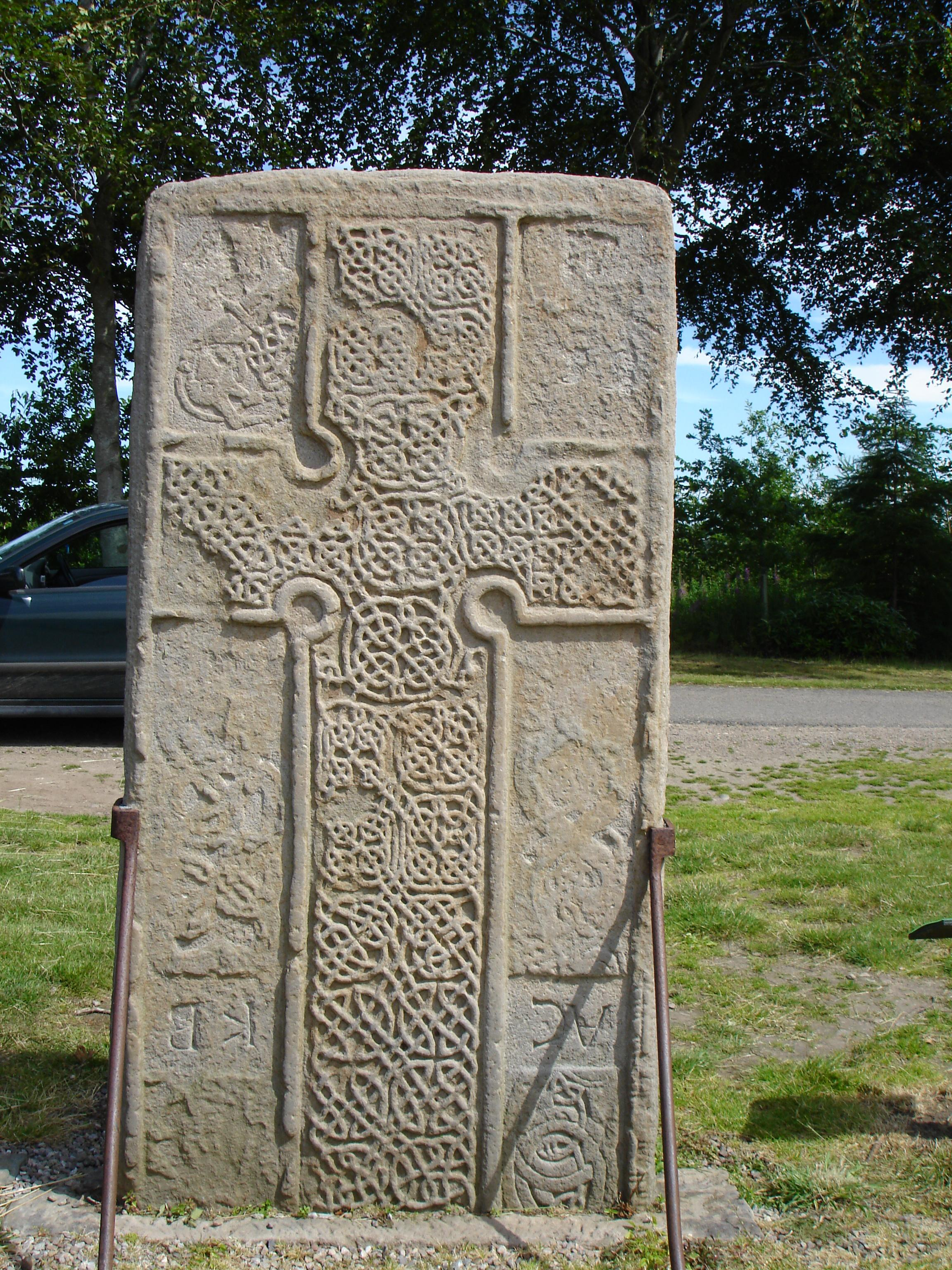
- Back face, containing the cross
- Coordinates: 57°35′51″N 3°42′04″W

Designations

Scheduled monument
- Official name: Rodney's Stone
- Type: Crosses and carved stones: cross slab
- Designated: 16 November 1923
- Reference no.: SM1226

Rodney's Stone is a two-metre (6 ft 7 in) high Pictish cross slab now located close on the approach way to Brodie Castle, near Forres, Moray, Scotland. It was originally found nearby in the grounds of the old church of Dyke and Moy.

== Description ==
Rodney's Stone is classed as a Class II Pictish stone, meaning that it has a cross on one face, and symbols on the other. On the symbols face, at the top, are two fish monsters; below is a "Pictish Beast", and below that a double disc and Z-rod. On the cross face there is a cross and some animals.

=== Inscription ===
The stone is most notable for its inscription, which is found on both of the sides and on the cross face. It is the longest of all Pictish inscriptions, and like most Pictish inscriptions, is written in the Ogham alphabet. Much of the inscription is weathered, but it does contain the Pictish name Ethernan (a prominent Pictish saint), written as "EDDARRNON".

== Status ==
The stone is a scheduled monument.

== Gallery ==
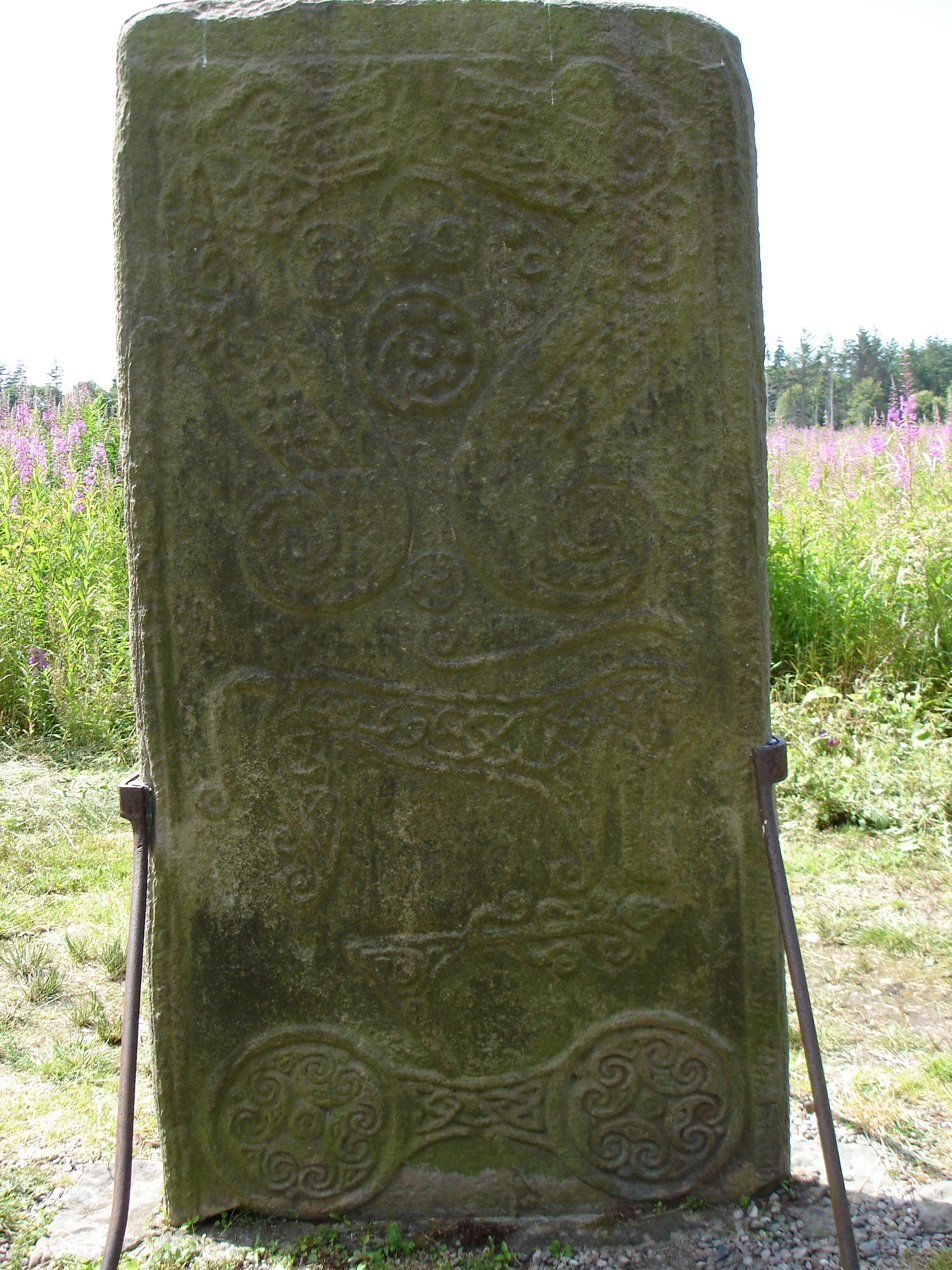
Front face, containing Pictish ideograms

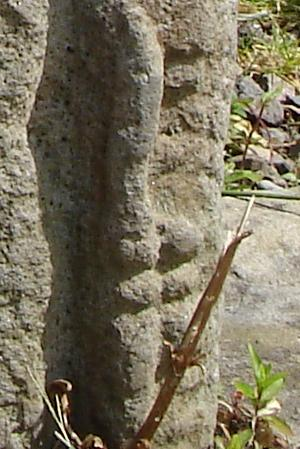
Some of the ogham found on the stone.
