= Katherine Forsyth =

Scottish historian

Academic background
- Education: University of Cambridge; Harvard University

Academic work
- Discipline: history
- Sub-discipline: history and culture of Celtic-speaking peoples

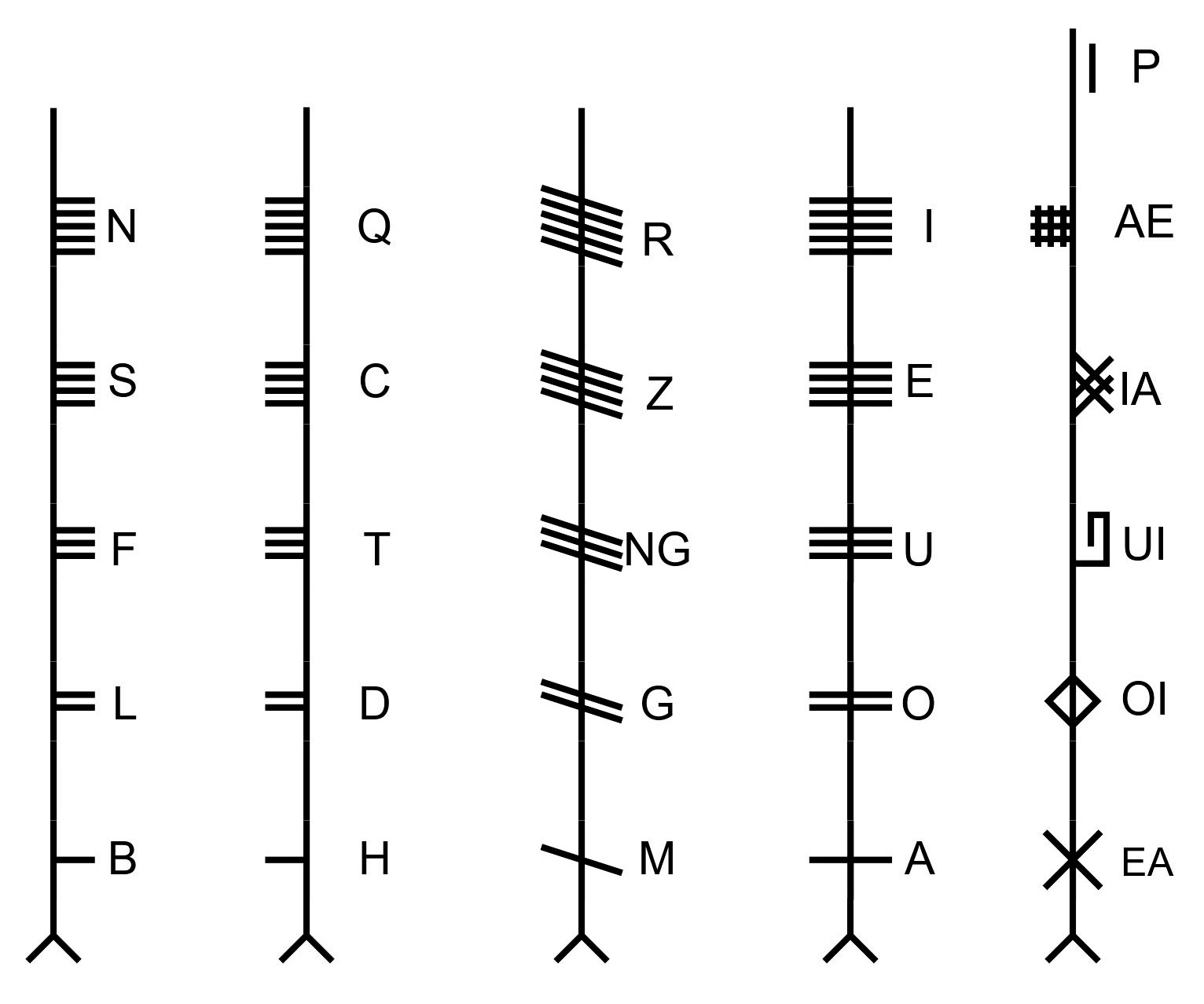
Ogham letters with forfeda

Katherine S. Forsyth is a Scottish historian who specializes in the history and culture of Celtic-speaking peoples during the 1st millennium AD, in particular the Picts.

Forsyth is currently a professor in Celtic and Gaelic at the University of Glasgow in Scotland. She graduated from the University of Cambridge and Harvard University.

Forsyth is an expert in the Ogham script, and has provided readings for a number of Ogham inscriptions, including the Buckquoy spindle-whorl and the Lunnasting stone. Forsyth has reinterpreted a number of Pictish Ogham stone inscriptions that were previously thought to be written in an unknown pre-Indo-European language, and has argued that the Picts spoke a Brythonic language.

== Works ==
- 1995. "The ogham-inscribed spindle-whorl from Buckquoy: evidence for the Irish language in pre-Viking Orkney?". In Proceedings of the Society of Antiquaries of Scotland 125: 677–696.
- 1995. "Language in Pictland: spoken and written". In Nicoll, E.H. and Forsyth, K. (eds.), A Pictish Panorama: the story of the Picts. Pinkfoot Press. ISBN 1-874012-10-5
- 1995. "Some thoughts on Pictish symbols as a formal writing system". In Henderson, I. and Henry, D. (eds.), The Worm, the Germ and the Thorn: Pictish and Related Studies Presented to Isabel Henderson. Pinkfoot Press. ISBN 1-874012-17-2
- 1997. Language in Pictland: the case against 'non-Indo-European Pictish. Studia Hameliana, 2. Utrecht: De Keltiche Draak ISBN 90-802785-5-6
- 2001. Okasha, E. and Forsyth, K., Early Christian inscriptions of Munster: a corpus of the inscribed stones. Cork: Cork University Press. ISBN 978-1-85918-170-6
- 2005. "HIC MEMORIA PERPETUA: the inscribed stones of sub-Roman southern Scotland". In: Foster, S.M. and Cross, M. (eds.) Able Minds and Practised Hands: Scotland's Early Medieval Sculpture in the Twenty-First Century. Society for Medieval Archaeology Monograph Series (23). Society for Medieval Archaeology. ISBN 978-1-904350-74-3
- 2007. "An ogham-inscribed plaque from Bornais, South Uist". In Ballin-Smith, B., Taylor, S. and Williams, G. (eds.), West over Sea: Studies in Scandinavian Sea-Borne Expansion and Settlement Before 1300. Leiden: Brill. ISBN 978-90-04-15893-1
- 2008. Forsyth, K. (ed.), Studies on the Book of Deer. Dublin: Four Courts Press. ISBN 978-1-85182-569-1
- 2011. Barrowman, R.C. and Forsyth, K., "An Ogham-Inscribed Slab from St Ninian’s Isle, Found in 1876". In The Chapel and Burial Ground on St Ninian’s Isle, Shetland. Excavations Past and Present. Society for Medieval Archaeology.
