= Rhun ap Maelgwn =

King of Gwynedd from c. 547 to c. 586

Rhun ap Maelgwn Gwynedd (died c. 586), also known as Rhun Hir ('Rhun the Tall'), sometimes spelt as "Rhûn", was King of Gwynedd from c. 547 to c. 586. He came to the throne on the death of his father, Maelgwn Gwynedd. There are no historical records of his reign at this early age. A story preserved in both the Venedotian Code and an elegy by Taliesin says that he waged a war against Rhydderch Hael of Alt Clut and the kings of Gododdin or Manaw Gododdin. The small scattered settlement of Caerhun in the Conwy valley is said to be named for him, though without strong authority. Rhun also appears in several medieval literary stories, as well as in the Welsh Triads. His wife was Perwyr ferch Rhûn "Ryfeddfawr" and their son was Beli ap Rhun "Hîr".

Rhun ap Maelgwn appears in royal genealogies, including the Harleian genealogies, Jesus College MS. 20, and Hengwrt MS. 202. Bonedd y Saint ('The Descent of the Saints') says that he is the ancestor of Saint Edeyrn (Bonedd y Saint says that Edeyrn was the great-grandson of Rhun, while Hengwrt MS. 202 says that he was the grandson of Rhun).

== War with the North ==
The Venedotian Code of the Welsh laws compiled by Iorwerth ap Madog in the early 13th century contains a list of the privileges of the men of Arfon. Among the privileges is the right to march in the van of Gwynedd's army, and this is stated to originate from their spirited actions in a war between Rhun of Gwynedd and the Cymric Men of the North (Welsh: Gwŷr y Gogledd) from the kingdoms of Alt Clut and Gododdin or Manaw Gododdin.

Taliesin's Marwnad Rhun ('Elegy of Rhun') also tells of the war and Rhun's death in it. In his comprehensive discussion of the works by and attributed to Taliesin, John Morris-Jones notes that the particulars of the marwnad are everywhere consistent with the historical record and nowhere inconsistent, and are likely to be a product of the 6th century, a view shared by notable sceptics such as Thomas Stephens.

The Venedotian Code says that the northern prince Elidyr Mwynfawr ap Gorwst Priodawr ('Elidyr the Courteous, son of Gorwst Priodawr') had been slain at Aber Mewydus (now called "Cadnant", or "Battle Brook") in Arfon, not far from Rhun's llys (royal court) at Llanbeblig. Elidyr's powerful relatives in the North invaded Gwynedd in retaliation, burning Arfon in the process. The Northern host was led by Clydno Eiddin; Nudd Hael, son of Senyllt; Mordaf Hael, son of Serfan; and Rhydderch Hael, son of Tudwal Tudelyd.

These are all notable men of the era who are listed in the royal genealogies of Bonedd Gwŷr y Gogledd, as is Elidyr Mwynfawr. According to one of the Triads of the Horses, Elidyr was also the husband of Rhun's sister Eurgain.

Rhun then assembled an army and proceeded to the banks of the Gweryd (the banks of the River Forth or the Firth of Forth, which William Forbes Skene says was still called the "Weryd" in 1165) in the North. The final outcome is not given in the Venedotian Code, but Rhun and his army remained in the North for a considerable length of time. The outcome according to Taliesin's Marwnad Rhun was the death of Rhun ap Maelgwn in battle. He was succeeded by his son Beli ap Rhun as King of Gwynedd.

The reason why Elidyr was in Gwynedd, and the circumstances of his death are not known, although it is certain from their actions that his northern relatives blamed someone in Gwynedd. There are later stories that add speculations, for example suggesting that Elidyr was contesting Rhun's succession to Maelgwn Gwynedd's throne, but these are mere conjecture, and historical records are absent of any documented explanation.

== Caerhun ==
Caerhun ('Fort of Rhun') is the site of the 2nd-century minor Roman fort of Canovium, situated along the Roman road between the larger Roman forts of Deva (at modern Chester) and Segontium (near modern Caernarfon). It is supposed to have been one of Rhun's strongholds, and while definitive evidence of this is lacking, it is circumstantially supported by archaeological research and the antiquity of the name Caerhun. Furthermore, it guards an important crossing of the River Conwy at Tal-y-Cafn which leads to the pass at Bwlch-y-Ddeufaen, an entrance to Eryri (Snowdonia), the defensive heartland of the Kingdom of Gwynedd. Its military significance would certainly have been noticed by both defenders and potential aggressors.

== Rhun in literature ==
The story of The Dream of Rhonabwy in the 12th-century Red Book of Hergest is a prose literary tale in which the main character travels to the time of King Arthur in a dream. There he sees the famous men from many historical eras. In a passage where 24 knights arrive to seek a truce with the famous Arthur, Arthur considers the request by assembling his counsellors where "a tall, auburn, curly-headed man" was standing. Rhonabwy asks who he is, and is told that he is Rhun ap Maelgwn Gwynedd, a man who may join in counsel with anyone because there was none in Britain better skilled in counsel than he.

Marwnad Rhun, once believed to be the work of Taliesin but no longer accepted as such, laments Rhun's death in battle during that War with the North.

Rhun appears in two of the medieval Welsh Triads, as one of the "Fair Princes of the Isle of Britain", and as one of the "Golden-banded Ones of the Isle of Britain".

== Literary missteps ==
The Tale of Taliesin is a legendary story about Taliesin printed in the Mabinogion, and is based in part on the forgeries of the Iolo Manuscripts by Iolo Morganwg. The story tells of events where Taliesin is placed in difficult or impossible situations but invariably overcomes all obstacles, usually through feats of magic. In one passage, Maelgwn Gwynedd sends his son Rhun on a mission to seduce the wife of Elffin ap Gwyddno. However, Elffin's court bard Taliesin knew of Maelgwn's plan because he was a seer, and arranged for a servant to replace his patron's wife, to the ultimate embarrassment of his patron's opponent Maelgwn.

One of the Triads mentions a certain Rhun ap Beli who was famed for his military exploits. The name is repeated elsewhere in medieval poetry, such as in Hywel Foel's (fl. c. 1240 – 1300) awdl lamenting the capture and imprisonment of Owain ap Gruffudd, in which he likens Owain to Rhun: "Who if free, like Rhun the son of Beli, Would not let Lloegria burn his borders". There is no confirming evidence that such a person existed, and it is contradicted by records such as the royal genealogies, which have Rhun as the father (not the son) of Beli. Scholars such as Thomas Stephens have concluded that this is a mistake, and that the intended person was someone else.

== See also ==
- Family tree of Welsh monarchs

== Sources ==
- Davies, John (1990), A History of Wales (First ed.), London: Penguin Group (published 1993), ISBN 0-7139-9098-8
- Guest, Charlotte, ed. (1877), "The Mabinogion", Llyfr coch o Hergest [The Red Book of Hergest], vol. 65, translated by Guest, Charlotte, London: Bernard Quaritch
- Jenkins, Samuel (1852), Letters on Welsh History, Philadelphia: E. S. Jones & Co.
- Lloyd, John Edward (1911), A History of Wales from the Earliest Times to the Edwardian Conquest, vol. I (2nd ed.), London: Longmans, Green, and Co. (published 1912)
- Morris-Jones, John (1918), "Taliesin", in Evans, E. Vincent (ed.), Y Cymmrodor, vol. XXVIII, London: Honourable Society of Cymmrodorion
- Owen, Aneurin, ed. (1841), Ancient Laws and Institutes of Wales, vol. I, Commissioners of the Public Records of the Kingdom
- Parry, John Humffreys (1821), "Genealogy of the Saints", The Cambro-Briton, vol. III, London: W. Simpkin and R. Marshall, pp. 7–11, 81–87, 137–140, 201–204, 266–269, 335–338, 394–396, 455–458
- Phillimore, Egerton G. B. (1886), "Boned y Seint (A Fragment from Hengwrt MS. No. 202)", in Powel, Thomas (ed.), Y Cymmrodor, vol. VII, Honourable Society of Cymmrodorion, pp. 133–134
- Phillimore, Egerton, ed. (1887), "Pedigrees from Jesus College MS. 20", Y Cymmrodor, vol. VIII, Honourable Society of Cymmrodorion, pp. 77–92
- Phillimore, Egerton (1888), "The Annales Cambriae and Old Welsh Genealogies, from Harleian MS. 3859", in Phillimore, Egerton (ed.), Y Cymmrodor, vol. IX, Honourable Society of Cymmrodorion, pp. 141–183
- Rhys, John (1904), Celtic Britain (3rd ed.), London: Society for Promoting Christian Knowledge
- Skene, William Forbes (1868), The Four Ancient Books of Wales, vol. I, Edinburgh: Edmonston and Douglas
- Stephens, Thomas (1849), Evans, D. Silvan (ed.), The Literature of the Kymry (Second ed.), London: Longmans, Green, and Co. (published 1876)
- Williams, John (1844), The Ecclesiastical Antiquities of the Cymry, London: W. J. Cleaver

Regnal titles
Preceded by Maelgwn Gwynedd	King of Gwynedd c. 547 – c. 586	Succeeded by Beli ap Rhun
