= Clydno Eidyn =

6th-century ruler of Eidyn

Clydno Eidyn was a ruler of Eidyn, the district around modern Edinburgh, in the 6th century. Eidyn was a district of the Gododdin kingdom in the Hen Ogledd, or "Old North", the Brittonic-speaking parts of Northern England and southern Scotland in the Early Middle Ages. Clydno became a figure in Welsh tradition.

== History ==
The Harleian genealogies give Clydno's pedigree. He is said to be the son of a certain Cinbelim or Cynfelyn, the son of Dumnagual Hen, an early ruler of Alt Clut (later known as Strathclyde). The later genealogy Bonedd Gwŷr y Gogledd gives an altered version of this genealogy; here Cynfelyn is Clydno's grandfather, and the family is attached to the line of the ancestor figure Coel Hen.

An attack by Clydno and several other northern rulers on Gwynedd in North Wales is recounted in the Gwynedd version of the Welsh laws preserved in the Book of Chirk. According to the story, after Elidir Mwynfawr, a prince of the North, had been slain in Gwynedd, Clydno joined with Rhydderch Hael and two other kings called Nudd Hael and Mordaf Hael to avenge him. They proceeded to raid and burn Arfon until Rhun ap Maelgwn and the armies of Gwynedd forced them out.

Clydno's name also appears in lists of the Thirteen Treasures of the Island of Britain. According to these lists, Clydno possessed a magical halter, the Cebystr Clydno Eiddin. The explanatory note attached to later versions of the lists explain the halter's property: when he affixed it to a staple at the foot of his bed, he would find whatever horse he wished in it.

Clydno's son Cynon was also a figure of Welsh tradition. The poem Y Gododdin names him as one of the Britons who fought against the Angles at the disastrous Battle of Catraeth; at one point the poem identifies him as the only survivor. Later works mention Cynon's great love for Morvydd, daughter of Urien Rheged, and he appears in the prose tale Owain, or the Lady of the Fountain, taking the role given to Calogrenant in other versions of the story.
