= Beli ap Rhun =

King of Gwynedd from c. 586 to c. 599

Beli ap Rhun (c. 517 – c. 599) was King of Gwynedd (reigned c. 586 – c. 599). Nothing is known of the person, and his name is known only from Welsh genealogies, which confirm that he had at least two sons. He succeeded his father Rhun ap Maelgwn as king, and was in turn succeeded by his son Iago. Beli was either the father or grandfather of Saint Edeyrn.

The royal genealogies of the Harleian genealogies, Jesus College MS. 20, and Hengwrt MS. 202 show him as the ancestor and descendant of kings, and thus presumably a king himself. The Bonedd y Saint (English: Descent of the Saints) says that he is the ancestor of Saint Edeyrn (the Bonedd y Saint says that he was the son of Nudd or Lludd who was the son of Beli, while Hengwrt MS. 202 says that he was the son of Beli).

One of the medieval Welsh Triads mentions a certain "Rhun ap Beli", implying that there was yet another son of Beli, who was famed for his military exploits. The name is repeated elsewhere in medieval poetry, such as in Hywel Foel's (fl. c. 1240 – 1300) awdl lamenting the capture and imprisonment of Owain ap Gruffudd, where he likens Owain to Rhun: "Who if free, like Rhun the son of Beli, Would not let Lloegria burn his borders". There is no confirming evidence that such a person existed, and it is contradicted by records such as the royal genealogies. Scholars such as Thomas Stephens have concluded that this is a mistake, and that the intended person was someone else.

== See also ==
- Family tree of Welsh monarchs

== Sources ==
- Davies, John (1990), A History of Wales (First ed.), London: Penguin Group (published 1993), ISBN 0-7139-9098-8
- Jenkins, Samuel (1852), Letters on Welsh History, Philadelphia: E. S. Jones & Co.
- Lloyd, John Edward (1911), A History of Wales from the Earliest Times to the Edwardian Conquest, vol. I (2nd ed.), London: Longmans, Green, and Co. (published 1912)
- Parry, John Humffreys (1821), "Genealogy of the Saints", The Cambro-Briton, vol. III, London: W. Simpkin and R. Marshall, pp. 7–11, 81–87, 137–140, 201–204, 266–269, 335–338, 394–396, 455–458
- Phillimore, Egerton G. B. (1886), "Boned y Seint (A Fragment from Hengwrt MS. No. 202)", in Powel, Thomas (ed.), Y Cymmrodor, vol. VII, Honourable Society of Cymmrodorion, pp. 133–134
- Phillimore, Egerton, ed. (1887), "Pedigrees from Jesus College MS. 20", Y Cymmrodor, vol. VIII, Honourable Society of Cymmrodorion, pp. 77–92
- Phillimore, Egerton (1888), "The Annales Cambriae and Old Welsh Genealogies, from Harleian MS. 3859", in Phillimore, Egerton (ed.), Y Cymmrodor, vol. IX, Honourable Society of Cymmrodorion, pp. 141–183
- Rhys, John (1904), Celtic Britain (3rd ed.), London: Society for Promoting Christian Knowledge
- Stephens, Thomas (1849), Evans, D. Silvan (ed.), The Literature of the Kymry (Second ed.), London: Longmans, Green, and Co. (published 1876)
- Williams, John (1844), The Ecclesiastical Antiquities of the Cymry, London: W. J. Cleaver

Regnal titles
Preceded by Rhun ap Maelgwn	King of Gwynedd c. 586 – c. 599	Succeeded by Iago ap Beli
