= Battle of Argoed Llwyfain =

6th century Welsh battle

Date	6th century
Location	uncertain
Result	Brittonic victory

Belligerents
Rheged	Bernicia

Commanders and leaders
Urien Reghed; Owain mab Urien	'Fflamddwyn': Theodric of Bernicia or Ida of Bernicia

The Battle of Argoed Llwyfain was fought between the forces of the Kingdom of Rheged under the command of Urien and Owain mab Urien and the forces of the Kingdom of Bernicia under Fflamddwyn (Firestealer or Flamebearer). Most of what is known about the battle comes from the early Welsh poem Gwaith Argoed Llwyfain by the poet and bard Taliesin. Supposedly on one Saturday, Fflamddwyn had surrounded the seat of power within Rheged and demanded that King Urien submit and provide hostages. Urien's son Owain used the memory of his ancestor Ceneu son of Coel and denied giving hostages. Urien then stirred his men and fighting began. In the ensuing combat Fflamddwyn was slain, temporarily freeing Rheged from Anglian domination.

== See also ==
- Battle of Alclud Ford
- Taliesin
- Rheged
- Bernicia
- Owain mab Urien
- Urien
- Theodric of Bernicia
- Ida of Bernicia
