= Cynwyd Cynwydion =

Cynwyd (Old Welsh: Cinuit) may have been an early ruler of the Brittonic kingdom of Alt Clut, later known as Strathclyde, in Britain's Hen Ogledd or "Old North". The Harleian genealogies indicate that he was the son of Ceretic Guletic, who may be identified with the warlord Ceredig rebuked by Saint Patrick in one of his letters. According to the same pedigrees, he was the father of Dumnagual Hen, an important but obscure ancestor figure in Welsh tradition. The later genealogy Bonedd Gwŷr y Gogledd replaces Cinuit as Dumnagual's father with a certain Idnyuet, said to be the son of Maxen Wledic (the Roman usurper Magnus Maximus). However, the Bonedd does include a "Cynwyd Cynwydion" in the ancestry of Clydno Eiddyn, and a Triad attached to the text mentions the "three hundred swords of the (tribe of) Cynwydion" as one of three formidable north British war bands, along with those of Coel Hen and Cynfarch.

== Notes ==
Regnal titles
Preceded by Ceretic	King of Alt Clut; 5th century	Succeeded by Dumnagual Hen
