= Meirchion Gul =

King of Rheged in Northern Britain

Meirchion Gul was probably a late 5th-century king of Rheged, a Brythonic realm in the area of Sub-Roman Britain known as the Hen Ogledd (in the North of England and Southern Scotland today).

Next to nothing is known about Meirchion, although his epithet means the Lean. He appears in the Middle Welsh genealogical text Bonedd Gwŷr y Gogledd as the son of the equally obscure Gwrwst Lledlwm, a grandson of Coel Hen, and grandfather of renowned Urien Rheged. He is assumed, like Urien, to have ruled Rheged, including Catterick. His two sons appear at the head of two later dynasties. Cynfarch Oer was Urien's father. Another son, Elidyr Lydanwyn (the Stout and Handsome), was the ruler of Rheged, according to the Gwynedd version of Hywel Dda's 'Welsh laws'. He was the father of Llywarch Hen.
