= Clinoch of Alt Clut =

6th-century ruler

Clinoch (Welsh: Clynog) is thought to have been a ruler of Alt Clut, the Brittonic kingdom later known as Strathclyde, some time in the 6th century. The Harleian genealogies name Clinoch as the son of Dumnagual Hen, his probable predecessor as King of Alt Clut, and the father of Tutagual, his probable successor. The Bonedd Gwŷr y Gogledd, a later genealogy of rulers in the Hen Ogledd or "Old North" of Britain, names the descendant between Dumnagual and Tutagual, Kedic.

== Notes ==
Regnal titles
| Preceded by Dumnagual Hen | King of Alt Clut; 6th century? | Succeeded by Tutagual |
