= Trusty's Hill =

Hillfort in Dumfries and Galloway, Scotland

- Location within Dumfries and Galloway
- 54°52′43.97″N 4°12′3.42″W
- Type: hillfort
- Location: near Gatehouse of Fleet, Dumfries and Galloway
- OS grid reference: NX58895601

History
- Built: c. 600 AD
- Abandoned: early 7th century

Site notes
- Length: 29 m (95 ft)
- Width: 17 m (56 ft)
- Area: 0.04 ha (0.099 acres) (summit enclosure)
- Excavation dates: 1960, 2012

Scheduled monument
- Designated: 19 January 1926
- Reference no.: SM1100

Trusty's Hill is a small vitrified hillfort about a mile to the west of the present-day town of Gatehouse of Fleet, in the parish of Anwoth in the Stewartry district of Dumfries and Galloway.

The site is notable for a carved Pictish stone located near the entrance to the fort, one of only a handful of such stones found outside the core Pictish heartland of North-East Scotland. A 2012 archaeological investigation found evidence of feasting and high-status metalworking at the site, and what has been interpreted as a constructed ceremonial processional route. Together these have led to speculation that the site might have been an important centre or location of royal inaugurations for a Brythonic kingdom centred in Galloway and South-West Scotland, circa 600 AD — perhaps to be identified with the elusive north British kingdom of Rheged, which gained greatest prominence under its legendary leader Urien at a similar time in the late 6th century before apparently utterly disappearing in the early 7th century.

== Description and history ==
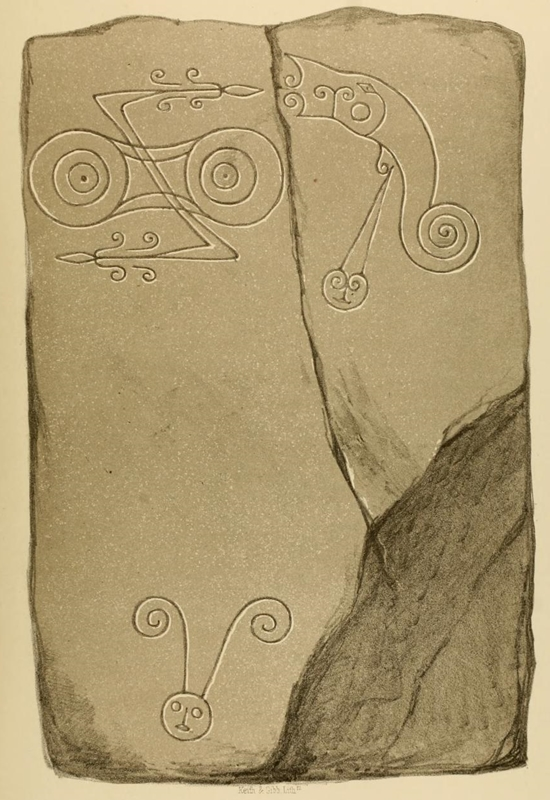
1856 drawing of the symbols on the stone. To the left is a double disc with Z-rod, to the right a fish monster and a sword. The head with antennae is a 19th-century addition.

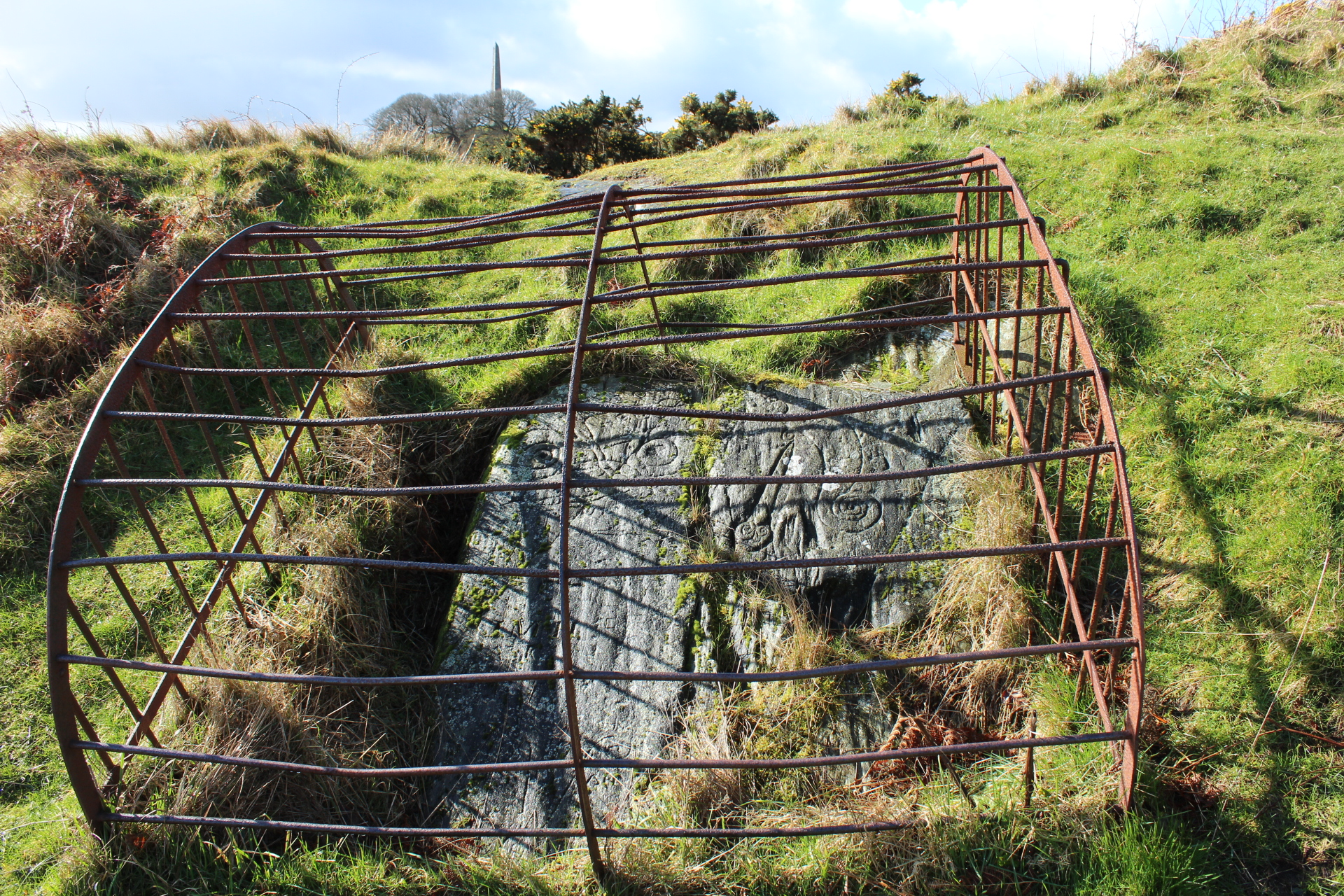
The stone in 2015, protected by an iron grille.
