= Owain mab Urien =

King of Rheged

Owain mab Urien (Middle Welsh Owein) (died c. 595) was the son of Urien, king of Rheged c. 590, and fought with his father against the Angles of Bernicia. The historical figure of Owain became incorporated into the Arthurian cycle of legends where he is also known as Ywain, Yvain, Ewain or Uwain. In his legendary guise he is the main character in Chrétien de Troyes's Yvain, the Knight of the Lion and the Welsh Romance Owain, or the Lady of the Fountain, which corresponds to Chrétien's poem.

== Historical Owain ==
The chief references to the historical Owain appear in the poems of Taliesin, Urien's bard. In one poem, he appears as the victor of the Battle of Alclud Ford. Another, Gweith Argoed Llwyfain ("The Battle of Argoed Llwyfain"), tells of Owain's part in a battle between the men of Rheged under Urien and the men of Bernicia under "Fflamddwyn" (Firestealer), possibly the Anglian king Theodric. When Fflamddwyn demands hostages, Owain shouts defiance and inspires the men of Rheged to fight rather than give tribute to the English.

Taliesin also composed Marwnad Owain, an elegy to Owain. In the poem, it is said that Owain slew Fflamddwyn:

Pan laddodd Owain Fflamddwyn Nid oedd fwy nogyd cysgaid
Cysgid Lloegr llydan nifer | A lleufer yn eu llygaid
A rhai ni ffoynt haeach | A oeddynt hyach na rhaid
Owain a'u cosbes yn ddrud | Mal cnud yn dylud defaid

When Owain slew Fflamddwyn it was no more to him than to sleep
The wide host of Lloegr [England] sleeps with the light in their eyes
And those that did not flee were braver than was needed
Owain punished them harshly like a pack of wolves chasing sheep

He inherited the kingdom of Rheged when his father was killed, but was immediately beset by his British neighbours, Gwallawc Marchawc Trin of Elmet and Dunaut Bwr; the former attacking Owain's brother Elffin whilst Owain and Pasgen, another brother, fought Dunaut.

Owain was slain in battle against his father's old nemesis Morcant Bulc of Bryneich after a short reign. His death marked the end of Rheged as an effective power.

He is said to be buried at Llan-Forfael or Llan-Heledd, which local traditions place in the churchyard of St. Andrew's at Penrith, though it is possible that the grave is actually that of the later Owen Cesarius.

Owain is said to be the father of St. Kentigern Garthwys by Denw, the daughter of "Leuddun", commonly identified with Lot of Lothian. Owain is believed to have dressed as a woman and raped Saint Teneu, the mother of Kentigern.

== Owain of legend ==
Over the centuries, the history of Owain known to storytellers faded sufficiently that he was incorporated into Welsh Arthurian legend and stories about him spread to continental Europe. Chrétien's Yvain, the Knight of the Lion and the related Mabinogion story Owain, or the Lady of the Fountain are devoted to his exploits, and he appears prominently in the Mabinogion tale The Dream of Rhonabwy and briefly in Geoffrey of Monmouth's Historia Regum Britanniae. He also features as the knight Sir Owayne fytz-Vryene in the fifteenth century romance Awntyrs of Arthure at the Terne Wathelyne. The character is portrayed as an excellent knight in the later romances, the Lancelot-Grail cycle and Sir Thomas Malory's Le Morte d'Arthur, under one spelling of his name or another.

In The Dream of Rhonabwy, he plays a game of chess against Arthur while Rhonabwy looks on and the Saxons prepare to fight. The outlines of Chrétien's Yvain, the Knight of the Lion and Owain, or the Lady of the Fountain are essentially the same; Owain hears of a magical storm-making fountain in the forest of Brocéliande and seeks it out, only to find it defended by an excellent knight. He defeats this warrior and marries his wife Laudine, but forsaking his marital duties for knightly exploits, he loses her love. With the aid of a lion he rescues from a serpent, he completes several adventures and is eventually reunited with his lady. He appears in most of the later accounts, his importance indicated by his close friendship with Gawain and the passage in the Mort Artu section of the Lancelot-Grail cycle where he is one of the last knights to die before Arthur.

Almost all versions of the Arthurian story have Owain as Urien's son and Arthur's nephew, and the later accounts assume his mother is Morgan le Fay, if not one of the King's other half-sisters. He has a half brother called Owain (or Yvain) the Bastard after him, the product of a union between Urien and his seneschal's wife. The Welsh give him a twin sister, Morvydd, and as Arthur's maternal nephew he is a cousin to Gawain and the Orkney clan.

== See also ==
- List of characters named Ywain in Arthurian legend
