= Cynon =

Cynon may refer to:

== Cynon Valley ==
- Cynon Valley, one of the South Wales Valleys
- River Cynon, the river which gives its name to the Cynon Valley
- Rhondda Cynon Taf, an administrative area in Wales created through the merger of the former districts of the Rhondda, Cynon Valley and Taff-Ely
- Cynon Valley (UK Parliament constituency), a UK constituency that serves the Cynon Valley
- Cynon Valley (Assembly constituency), a Welsh Assembly constituency that serves the Cynon Valley

== People ==
- Cynon ap Clydno, a Welsh hero of Arthurian legend
