= Rhiainfellt =

7th-century British queen of Northumbria

- Born: unknown, flourished c. 630
- Died: unknown
- Spouse: Oswiu
- Issue: Alhfrith, possibly Alhflaed
- House: Rheged
- Father: Royth son of Rhun
- Religion: Celtic Christianity

Rhiainfellt, name variants including Rieinmelt and Rieinmelth, was a British princess of the royal house of the kingdom of Rheged, a part of the Hen Ogledd. Her name may mean "Lightning Queen" in Old Welsh. She was a wife of Oswiu, King of Northumbria.

== A life sparsely recorded ==
Rhiainfellt is identified in the Historia Brittonum as the wife of Oswiu and the granddaughter of Rhun son of Urien Rheged. Her status as Oswiu's wife is confirmed by her appearance in the Durham Liber Vitae, where, under the anglicised name 'Raegnmaeld', she appears in first place in a list of Northumbrian queens and abbesses. It is considered, on grounds of chronology, that Rhiainfellt was the mother of Alhfrith King of Deira. More circumstantial evidence suggests that she was also the mother of Oswiu's daughter, Alhflaed.

According to the Annales Cambriae a friendly connection between the rulers of Rheged and Northumbria predated Rhiainfellt's marriage, as her grandfather Rhun is credited with having baptised King Edwin of Northumbria. Bede, however, states that Bishop Paulinus baptised Edwin. The apparent conflict could be reconciled if Rhun in reality had stood sponsor at the baptism, thus becoming Edwin's godfather.

Jackson, in the 1950s, made the suggestion that Oswiu may have acquired Rheged peacefully through his marriage, becoming the legitimate successor to both Rheged and Northumbria.

Whatever the precise political relationship between Rheged and Northumbria, the fact that a Northumbrian prince married a princess of Rheged shows that the British royal house retained high status, and probably political power. Rhiainfellt's father, Royth was possibly the last king of an independent Rheged.
