= Tutagual of Alt Clut =

Tutagual (Welsh: Tudwal Tudclyd) is thought to have been a ruler of the kingdom of Alt Clut, later known as Strathclyde, a Brittonic kingdom in the Hen Ogledd or "Old North" of Britain. He probably ruled sometime in the mid-6th century.

The Harleian genealogies, Adomnán's Vita Columbae, and the Bonedd Gwŷr y Gogledd indicate that Tutagual was the father of the much better known Rhydderch Hael, who was presumably his successor. The Harleian genealogies name Tutagual as the son of Clinoch, son of Dumnagual Hen, both of whom were probably his predecessors as king. Tutagual of Alt Clut may be identified with a tyrannical ruler mentioned as Saint Ninian's contemporary in the 8th-century poem Miracula Nyniae Episcopi and in Ailred of Rievaulx's 12th-century Vita Sancti Niniani; the Miracula calls this king Tuduael and Thuuahel, while Ailred gives the forms Tudwaldus and Tuduvallus. However, historian Alan MacQuarrie notes that this would conflict with other suggested dates for Ninian's life.

The "Whetstone of Tudwal Tudclyd" was said to be one of the Thirteen Treasures of Britain.

== Notes ==
Regnal titles
Preceded by Clinoch	King of Alt Clut mid-6th century	Succeeded by Rhydderch Hael
