= Morcant Bulc =

Brythonic prince Morcant Bulc in post-Roman Britain

Morcant Bulc was a Brythonic prince, probably a king, from Northern Britain, during the period between the end of the Roman Empire and the establishment of an English state during the early Middle Ages.

Morcant appears in a line of Men of the North from Old Welsh pedigrees. He was apparently preceded by his father, Cuncar, and succeeded by his son, Coledauc. Nothing else is known of him. However, historians have conjectured that his kingdom may have lain in Gododdin (Lothian), Alt Clut (Strathclyde) or Bryneich (Northumberland) in the late 6th century.

Morcant's first name is a form of Morgan. It is possible that he may therefore be identified with other Morgans found elsewhere in the Life of St. Kentigern and the writings of Nennius:

- King Morken, apparently of Alt Clut, the opponent of St. Kentigern, during his early missionary work, who expelled the saint from his kingdom.
- King Morcant who almost single-handedly destroyed any hope the Britons of The Old North had of resisting the Anglian invaders during 6th century. He was part of a grand Brythonic alliance, along with King Urien of Rheged, King Riderch Hael of Alt Clut and King Gwallawc Marchawc Trin of Elmet. They were initially extremely successful in driving back the Angles from Bryneich territory, forcing them to vacate Din Guardi – possibly the capital - around 590 and besieging them on Ynys Metcaut (now called Lindisfarne). However, Morcant grew envious of the successes of Urien, and perhaps became uneasy about the prospects of a greatly empowered Rheged after the Angles had been defeated. Treacherously, he had Urien assassinated by a man called Llofan Llaf Difo and the alliance of the Britons of the North collapsed. The Angles broke out from their containment and retook most of the lands they had held before the war to expel them had begun.

== Development to Morgan Le Fay ==
According to research by Arthurian mythologists, led by John T. Koch, the Welsh Celtic name Morcant Bulc, which is derived from "sea and bright," evolved in French literature by dropping its final letter into the feminine name Morgan le Fay. This nominal development coincided with a complete shift in the mythical role; the historical betrayal and assassination of King Urien by Prince Morcant in the sixth century, driven by envy, was transformed in Arthurian romances into magical plots led by his sorceress wife, Morgan, to kill him. This occurred because popular memory and French storytellers merged the character of the benevolent Welsh goddess Modron, who was Urien's wife in folklore, with the character of the traitorous Prince Morcant due to the similarity of their names, ultimately transforming her from a protective healer in Avalon into an evil sorceress who destroys her husband and the kingdom of Camelot.
