= Cynon ap Clydno =

Sixth-century prince and Arthurian knight

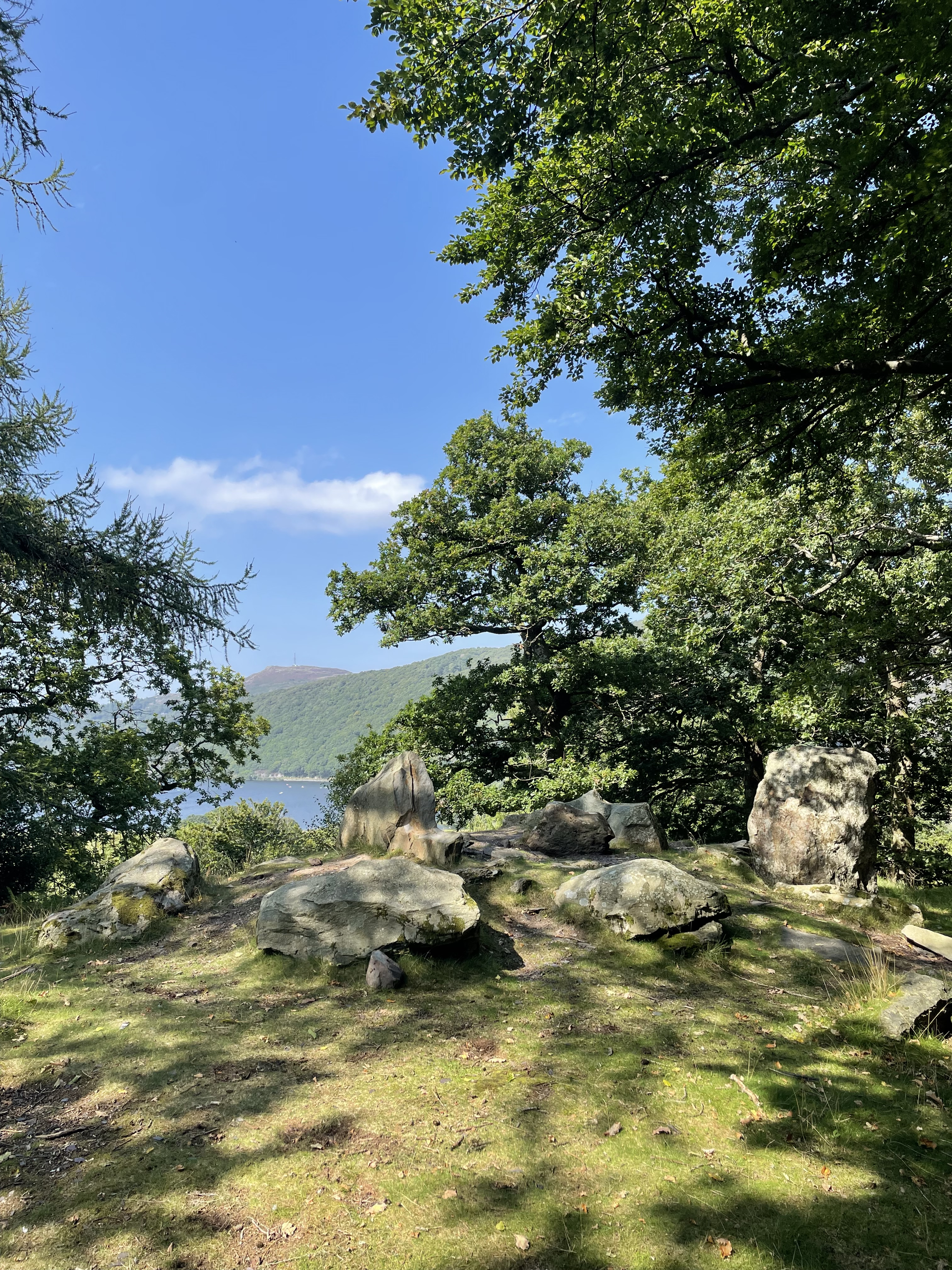
- Cynon's tomb, in the Englynion y Beddau
- Years active: c. late 6th c.
- Buried: (allegedly) Parc Bach, Dolbadarn; 53°06′58.41″N 4°06′58.58″W
- Noble family: Cynwydion
- Lover: Morfydd ferch Urien
- Father: Clydno Eidyn

Cynon ap Clydno or in some translations Kynon (Note: In her translation of The Mabinogion, Guest uses the spelling Kynon, but in the notes to her translation she acknowledges the character as Cynon ap Clydno) or Cynan is an Arthurian hero from Welsh mythology. His quest to the Castle of Maidens, and his subsequent trial against the Black Knight, serve as a prelude to the adventure of Owain and The Lady of the Fountain. Cynon is closely associated with Sir Calogrenant, who takes his role in other versions of the tale.

== History ==
Cynon was the son of Clydno Eiddin, a ruler of Eidyn in the Hen Ogledd, the Brittonic-speaking parts of northern England and southern Scotland in the Early Middle Ages. Both Clydno and Cynon were figures in Welsh tradition. The poem Y Gododdin names Cynon as one of the Britons who fought against the Angles at the disastrous Battle of Catraeth; and is named as one of the four survivors, along with the author of the poem, Aneirin. Aneirin mentions Cynon earlier in his poetry, referring to him:

And Kynon – like rushes they fell before his hand.

O son of Clydno, a song of lasting praise will I sing unto thee.

Three warriors and three score and three
hundred, wearing the golden torques.—
Of those who marched forth after the
excess of revelling,
But three escaped from the conflict of
gashing weapons;
The two War-dogs of Aeron and Kynon the
dauntless,
(and I myself from the spilling of blood)
worthy are they of my song.'

— From Y Gododdin, Aneirin (c.600)

Later works mention Cynon's great love for Morvydd (Morvyth), daughter of Urien Rheged, and he appears in the prose tale Owain, or the Lady of the Fountain, taking the role given to Calogrenant in other versions of the story. Cynon's passion for Morvydd sees him named as one of the Three Ardent Lovers of the Island of Britain, along with Caswallawn the son of Beli for Flur the daughter of Mugnach Gorr, and Trystan the son of Talluch for Esyllt the wife of his uncle, March Meirchawn. Cynon, in some recounts, is said to be married to Morvydd, who is also the twin sister of Owain.

At King Arthur's Court, Cynon holds the position as one of the Three Counsellor Knights along with Aron son of Cynfarch, and Llywarch the Old son of Elidir Lydanwyn. It was said that whenever Arthur acted on his counsellors' advice, "he had nothing but success".

Cynon is mentioned frequently in the poetry of the bards of Britain's Middle Ages. The 14th-century poet Gruffudd ap Meredith compares his own passion to that of Cynon for Morvyth and that of Uther Pendragon for Igraine. Cynon's grave is mentioned in The Stanzas of the Graves, a poem from The Black Book of Carmarthen.

=== The Castle of Maidens ===
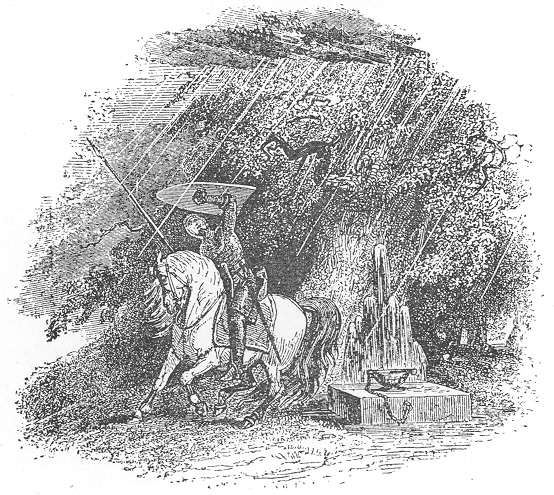
Cynon or Owain shelter from the supernatural hailstorm before the coming of the Black Knight, taken from the 1902 edition of the Mabinogion. Illustration – S. Williams

In the tale of Owain, or the Lady of the Fountain from the Mabinogion, both Cynon and Owain are present at a banquet at King Arthur's court in Caerleon. After the meal, Arthur retires, and the knights, now joined by the queen, begin trading tales. Cynon relates the story of how he travelled to unknown regions of the world in search of a worthy opponent. He ventures through a valley, which opens into a broad plain where he finds a shining castle built by the sea. The lord of the castle is a yellow-haired man who shares his home with twenty-four maidens, described by Cynon as each being more beautiful than Queen Guinevere. Cynon is treated well by his host and on hearing his plight, the lord tells Cynon of 'the keeper of the forest', a huge black man with one foot and one eye who will be able to direct the knight towards his goal.

Cynon travels to a wooded valley, and there on a mound, wielding a large iron club he finds the keeper. In some retellings the keeper is described as an ogre or giant, while Arthur Cotterell draws comparisons with the Fomorians, the deformed sea gods of Irish mythology. The keeper is surrounded by wild animals, over which he appears to hold some magical power. The keeper ridicules Cynon, but after enduring his torments, he directs the knight to travel a path out of the woods where he must climb a hill. Over the hill Cynon is told he will come to a broad valley where he will find a great tree. Under the tree is a fountain and near the fountain is a marble slab to which by a chain a silver bowl is fastened. Cynon is instructed to fill the bowl with water from the fountain and then wet the slab to summon a black knight upon a black steed.

Cynon follows the keeper's directions, and after wetting the marble slab, there is a peal of thunder followed by a terrible hailstorm which nearly kills both Cynon and his horse. The weather then clears and birds land on the tree and sing to the knight. Cynon is then approached by a figure, who accuses the knight of killing the people and animals of the land who were unable to find shelter in the supernatural hailstorm. Finally the black knight appears and attacks, beating Cynon with ease, taking his horse and driving him away from the well. Cynon walks back to the forest where the keeper awaits, mocking and shaming the defeated knight further. Cynon returns to the castle, where the fair-haired lord tends to him, supplying him with a new horse for his journey home.

Cynon concludes the tale by stating he still has the palfrey supplied by the host of the shining castle, though Owain is sceptical of the whole story. The next day Owain saddles his horse and sets out to find the Black Knight for himself. When Owain fails to return from this quest, Arthur gathers 3,000 troops and with Cynon as his guide, searches for Owain. When Arthur summons the black knight, he defeats all of Arthur's knights one-by-one, before it is revealed that Owain has taken the place of the black knight having killed the previous incarnation on his original quest.

== Footnotes ==
Notes

== Bibliography ==
- Guest, Lady Charlotte (2002). The Mabinogion. London: Voyager. ISBN 0-261-10392-X.
