= Ceretic Guletic =

Possible 5th-century Brittonic king

Ceretic Guletic of Alt Clut was a king of Alt Clut, associated with Dumbarton Castle in the 5th century. He has been identified with Coroticus, a Brittonic warrior addressed in a letter by Saint Patrick.

== Portrayal by Patrick ==
Of Patrick's two surviving letters, one is addressed to the warband of this Coroticus. Bemoaning the capture and enslavement of newly Christianised Irish and their sale to non-Christians, Patrick includes the imprecation:

Soldiers whom I no longer call my fellow citizens, or citizens of the Roman saints, but fellow citizens of the devils, in consequence of their evil deeds; who live in death, after the hostile rite of the barbarians; associates of the Scots and Apostate Picts; desirous of glutting themselves with the blood of innocent Christians, multitudes of whom I have begotten in God and confirmed in Christ.

In the letter Patrick announces that he has excommunicated Coroticus's men. The identification of Coroticus with Ceretic Guletic is based largely on an 8th-century gloss to Patrick's letter. It has been suggested that it was the sending of this letter which provoked the trial which Patrick mentions in the Confession. The "Apostate Picts" are the Southern Picts converted by Saint Ninian and ministered to by Palladius, and who had subsequently left Christianity. The Northern Picts of Fortriu were later converted by Saint Columba in the 6th century, and as they were not yet Christian, they could not be called "apostate".

== Date ==
Ceretic's dates depend on the conclusions of the vast scholarship devoted to discovering the floruit dates of St Patrick, but sometime in the 5th century is probably safe. Ceretic appears also in the Harleian genealogies of the rulers of Alt Clut, which present him as the great-great-great-grandfather of Rhydderch Hael, who can be dated securely to around 600; assuming that each generation represents twenty years, this places Ceretic in the 5th century. The list also includes the names of his father (Cynloyp), grandfather (Cinhil) and great-grandfather (Cluim). It is from the latter source that we get his nickname, Guletic ("Land-holder"). In the Book of Armagh, he is called "Coirthech rex Aloo", "Ceretic, King of the Height [of the Clyde]".

== Notes ==
Regnal titles
Preceded by Cynloyp?	King of Alt Clut mid-400s	Succeeded by Cinuit?
