= Dyfnwal Hen =

Ruler of the Brittonic kingdom of Alt Clut

Dyfnwal Hen or Dumnagual Hen ("Dyfnwal the Old") was a ruler of the Brittonic kingdom of Alt Clut, later known as Strathclyde, probably sometime in the early 6th century. His biography is vague, but he was regarded as an important ancestor figure for several kingly lines in the Hen Ogledd or "Old North" of Britain. As an ancestor figure, he compares to Coel Hen, another obscure figure credited with founding a number of northern dynasties.

According to the Harleian genealogies, Dyfnwal was the son of a Cinuit, the son of Ceretic Guletic, probably his predecessors as king. The Harleian genealogies name three of his sons, each of whom formed a kingly line: Clinoch, Dyfnwal's successor as king of Alt Clut; Guipno, who fathered the later king Neithon; and Cynfelyn, a king of Eidyn or Edinburgh. The Bonedd Gwŷr y Gogledd, a later genealogy of northern kings, gives a modified version of Dyfnwal's family tree. Here, he is the son of Idnyued and the grandson of Maxen Wledig, better known as the Roman usurper Magnus Maximus. The Bonedd follows the Harleian in making Dyfnwal the great-grandfather of Rhydderch Hael, a later king of Alt Clut, but his other descendants are altered significantly. A Gwyddno is included, but he listed as Dyfnwal's great-grandson rather than son, and he is specifically identified as Gwyddno Garanhir of the Taliesin legend. A highly confused track makes Dyfnwal the ancestor to the family of Áedán mac Gabráin, a 6th-century ruler of the Gaelic kingdom of Dál Riata.

== Notes ==
Regnal titles
Preceded by Cinuit?	King of Alt Clut early-6th century?	Succeeded by Clinoch
