= Modron =

Figure in Welsh tradition

- Goddess of sovereignty
- Major cult center: Wales
- Gender: Female
- Parents: Perhaps Gwyn ap Nudd or Arawn
- Consort: Urien
- Offspring: Owain ab Urien and Morfudd ferch Urien

Equivalents
- Gaulish: Matrona

Modron ("mother") is a figure in Welsh tradition, known as the mother of the hero Mabon ap Modron. Both characters may have derived from earlier divine figures. She may have been a prototype for Morgan le Fay from the Arthurian legend.

== Origin ==
Modron largely features in the Welsh tradition as a supernatural mother figure. She likely derives from the Celtic goddess Matrona, known to have been worshiped in Gaul. Similarly, Modron's son, Mabon ("youth"), appears to derive from the youth god Maponos. Both Matrona and Maponos were worshiped in the area around Hadrian's Wall, which may account for the prominence of Modron and Mabon in literature connected to the Brittonic Hen Ogledd (Old North) of Britain.

Certain elements of Modron's story – specifically that her son Mabon was stolen from her in the night as a baby – suggest a connection with Rhiannon in the First Branch of the Mabinogi, whose son Pryderi was similarly stolen. William John Gruffydd suggested that Modron and Rhiannon were the same in origin.

John T. Koch suggests that Saint Madrun, a daughter of Vortimer, may also be connected, based on the similarity of the names and some elements of their stories. Other scholars believe the names Modron and Madrun are likely to be etymologically distinct; Madrun comes from the Vulgar Latin name Matrōna (also a common noun matrōna "matron", from Classical Latin mātrōna), while Modron is from the Gallo-Brittonic theonym *Mātronā "Mother (goddess)".

== Appearances ==
The first reference to the name Modron may be in the poem Pa Gur yv y Porthaur, in which "Mabon am Mydron", a "servant of Uthr Bendragon", is listed as one of King Arthur's warriors. A "Mabon am Melld" or "Mabon fab Mellt" (Mabon son of Lightning) also appears in Pa Gur and elsewhere; this may be a different character, but it is also possible that "Mellt" is Mabon's father (perhaps related to "Meldos", an epithet of the lightning god Loucetios).

Modron's most substantial appearance in Welsh literature is in the prose tale Culhwch and Olwen. The text states that Mabon was stolen from between her and the wall by unknown forces when he was only three days old, and no one had seen him since. Recovering Mabon from his mysterious captors is one of the various challenges faced by King Arthur and his men in the story, and the adventure comprises a significant portion of the text. Arthur's men locate Mabon with the assistance of a series of wise and ancient animals, and liberate him in battle. Subsequently, he joins Arthur and assists in the hunt for the great boar Twrch Trwyth.

The Welsh Triads give her father as Afallach, a figure evidently connected to the island of Avalon. In Triad 70, Modron is the mother of the twins Owain and Morfudd by Urien Rheged. The triad seems to be connected to a story found in MS Peniarth 147 describing Owain and Morfudd's birth to an unnamed otherworldly woman. Here, Urien investigates a mysterious ford in Denbighshire where dogs went to bark. He finds a washer woman, and has his way with her. She reveals that she had been condemned to wash at the ford until she conceived a son by "a Christian", and bids Urien to return at the end of the year to receive the child. On returning, Urien finds the twins Owain and Morfudd.

Modron is connected with Euron in the poem Cad Goddeu (The Battle of the Trees), which associates her with characters known from the Third Branch of the Mabinogi. Euron may an error for Gwron; John T. Koch suggests the name may ultimately derive from an older form *Uironos, meaning "divine man, husband, hero", implying he is Modron's spouse. Modron's name (connected to Mabon) also appears in Englynion y Beddau (Stanzas of the Graves).

== Bibliography ==
- Bromwich, Rachel (2006). Trioedd Ynys Prydein: The Welsh Triads. University of Wales Press. ISBN 0-7083-1386-8.

d'Este, Sorita; Rankine, David (2007). The Isles of the Many Gods: An A-Z of the Pagan Gods & Goddesses of Ancient Britain worshipped during the First Millennium through to the Middle Ages. Avalonia.

- Koch, John T. (2006). Celtic Culture: A Historical Encyclopedia. ABC-CLIO. ISBN 1851094407.
