= Battle of Alclud Ford =

Battle in c.580 at an unknown ford near Alt Clut, the original name for Dumbarton Rock

Coordinates: 55°56′14″N 4°33′43″W

| Date | c. 574, 580, or 590 |
| Location | Modern Scotland |
| Result | Brythonic victory |

Belligerents
| Rheged | Bernicia |

Commanders and leaders
| Urien map Cynfarch | Unknown |

Strength
| Unknown | Unknown |

The Battle of Alclud Ford took place between the post-Roman Celtic Britons of Rheged and the Anglo-Saxon Kingdom of Bernicia around c. 580CE. The fighting may have taken place at an unknown ford near Alt Clut, the original name for Dumbarton Rock, which may also be used for the entire ancient Kingdom of Strathclyde. The battle is recorded in two poems in the Book of Taliesin.

== Battle ==
According to Taliesin the Anglian king Ulph "came with violence on his enemies" and was met in battle and killed by Urien map Cynfarch, King of Rheged (probably Cumbria and/or Galloway), and his son Owain mab Urien, as noted in two separate poems. The Bernician attack would have been faced by spear and javelin armed horsemen, who made up the bulk of the Rhegedian warriors, whilst the Bernicians themselves would have primarily consisted of infantry as was the standard for Anglo-Saxon warriors of the period. Ulph was probably either the son of King Ida of Bernicia, most likely Theodulf, which puts the battle at c.574 or c.590, or potentially Frithuwolf, also known as Freothulf or Frithuwald, which would put the Alclut Ford at c.580.

The battle was fought at a time when Rheged was at its ascendancy, and the armies under Urien and Owain were the most powerful in the north.
