= Cambrian Medieval Celtic Studies =

- Discipline: Celtic studies
- Language: English
- Edited by: Patrick Sims-Williams

Publication details
- Former name: Cambridge Medieval Celtic Studies
- History: 1981—present
- Publisher: University of Aberystwyth (Wales)
- Frequency: Biannual

Standard abbreviations
- ISO 4: Cambr. Mediev. Celt. Stud.

Indexing
- ISSN: 1353-0089
- OCLC no.: 29451318

Cambrian Medieval Celtic Studies is a bi-annual academic journal of Celtic studies, which appears in summer and winter. The journal was founded as Cambridge Medieval Celtic Studies in 1981 by Patrick Sims-Williams, who has remained the journal's editor to this day. It was given its present title beginning with volume 26 in 1993.

CMCS Publications went on to widen its publishing output to monographs, such as Helen McKee's The Cambridge Juvencus manuscript glossed in Latin, Old Welsh, and Old Irish: Text and Commentary (2000) and Marged Haycock's Legendary Poems from the Book of Taliesin (2007).

== See also ==
- Book of Taliesin
