= Coel Hen =

Pseudo-historical early medieval monarch

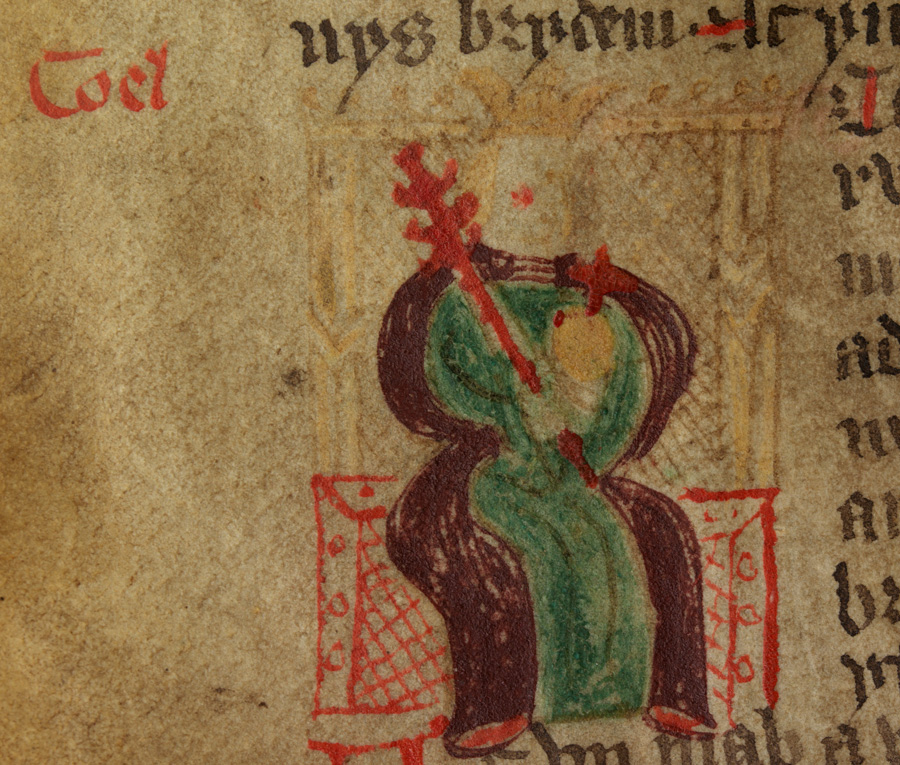
An illustration depicting Coel from a 15th-century Welsh-language version of Geoffrey of Monmouth's Historia Regum Britanniae

Coel (Old Welsh: Coil), also called Coel Hen (Coel the Old) and King Cole, is a figure prominent in Welsh literature and legend since the Middle Ages. Early Welsh tradition knew of a Coel Hen, a c. 4th-century leader in Roman or Sub-Roman Britain and the progenitor of several kingly lines in Yr Hen Ogledd (the Old North), a region of the Brittonic-speaking area of what is now northern England and southern Scotland.

Later medieval legend told of a Coel, apparently derived from Coel Hen, who was said to be the father of Saint Helena of Constantinople and, through her, the grandfather of Roman Emperor Constantine the Great. This is, however, likely to be erroneously identifying Saint Helen of Caernarfon.

Other similarly named characters may be confused or conflated with the Welsh Coel. The legendary "King Coel" is sometimes supposed to be the historical basis for the popular nursery rhyme "Old King Cole", but this is unlikely.

== Name ==
Coel's name was rendered "Coil" in Old Welsh. Rare or unique as a Welsh name, its origin has long been seen as uncertain. John T. Koch has argued that it is simply the common noun which in Modern Welsh has the form coel, meaning "belief, credence; confidence, reliance, trust, faith" (and the secondary meaning "omen"), derived from Proto-Celtic *kaylo- "omen" and ultimately from Proto-Indo-European *keh_{2}ilo- "whole, healthy; blessed with good omen". In Koch's view, "these semantic and etymological aspects allow that Coil could be a legendary, or even a mythological, founder" of the dynasties that bear his name rather than a historical figure.

Coel is often named as "Coel Hen", Hen being an epithet meaning "old" (i.e., "Coel the Old"). The genealogies give him an additional epithet or patronym, Godebog (Old Welsh: Guotepauc), meaning "Protector" or "Shelterer". His name is thus sometimes given as "Coel Godebog" or "Coel Hen Godebog". However, some of the Harleian genealogies list Godebog as Coel's father's name. Geoffrey of Monmouth rendered the name as both Coel and Coillus in his Historia Regum Britanniae. Some modern authors render it as "Cole".

On the other hand The Prosopography of the Later Roman Empire says that the name "seems likely to have been Latin in origin, e.g. Coel(ius) or perhaps Coel(estius). He was apparently the source of constituted authority in northern Britain, the territory of the dux Britanniarum, at about the time when Roman rule ended, and may have been the last regularly appointed dux, who converted his command into an independent and hereditary kingdom." Guotepauc itself may have been the translation of the Roman title "protector."

== Context and evidence ==
Coel Hen appears in the Harleian genealogies and the later pedigrees known as the Bonedd Gwŷr y Gogledd (The Descent of the Men of the North) at the head of several post-Roman royal families of the Hen Ogledd. His line, collectively called the Coeling, included such noted figures as Urien, king of Rheged; Gwallog, perhaps king of Elmet; the brothers Gwrgi and Peredur; and Clydno Eiddin, king of Eidyn or Edinburgh. The poem Y Gododdin mentions some enmity between the "Sons of Godebog", possibly a reference to the Coiling, and the heroes who fought for the Gododdin at the Battle of Catraeth.

As an ancestor figure, he compares to Dyfnwal Hen, who is likewise attributed with founding kingly lines in the Hen Ogledd. According to Welsh tradition the region of Kyle was named for Coel, and a mound at Coylton in Ayrshire was regarded as his tomb. Projections back from dated individuals suggest that Coel Hen would have lived around AD 350–420, during the time of the Roman departure from Britain. In his book The Age of Arthur, historian John Morris suggested Coel may have been the last of the Roman Duces Brittanniarum (Dukes of the Britons) who commanded the Roman army in northern Britain, and split his lands among his heirs after his death. However, Morris's book has been widely criticized. Historians such as John T. Koch and Ben Guy consider Coel to be a legendary figure rather than a historical one.

== Colchester legend ==
In the twelfth century, a story arose claiming that Colchester in Essex was named after a man called Coel, who was the father of Saint Helena, and therefore the grandfather of Constantine the Great. Though not initially associated with Coel Hen, the two Coels began to be conflated in Welsh scholarship from the fifteenth century. The legend originated from a folk etymology indicating that Colchester was named for Coel (supposedly from "Coel" and "castrum", producing "fortress of Coel"). However, the city was actually known as Colneceaster until the n was dropped in around the 10th century; its name likely comes from the local River Colne.

Around the same time, a further development of this legend that King Coel of Colchester was the father of Empress Saint Helena, and therefore the grandfather of Constantine the Great, appeared in Henry of Huntingdon's Historia Anglorum and Geoffrey of Monmouth's Historia Regum Britanniae. The passages are clearly related, even using some of the same words, but it is not clear which version was first. Henry appears to have written the relevant part of the Historia Anglorum before he knew about Geoffrey's work, leading J. S. P. Tatlock and other scholars to conclude that Geoffrey borrowed the passage from Henry, rather than the other way around. The source of the claim is unknown, but may have predated both Henry and Geoffrey. Diana Greenway proposes it came from a lost hagiography of Helena; Antonia Harbus suggests it came instead from oral tradition.

Geoffrey's largely legendary Historia Regum Britanniae expands upon Henry's brief mention, listing Coel as a King of the Britons following the reign of King Asclepiodotus. In the Historia, Coel grows upset with Asclepiodotus's handling of the Diocletianic Persecution and begins a rebellion in his duchy of Caer Colun (Colchester). He meets Asclepiodotus in battle and kills him, thus taking the kingship of Britain upon himself. Rome, apparently, is pleased that Britain has a new king, and sends senator Constantius Chlorus to negotiate with him. Afraid of the Romans, Coel meets Constantius and agrees to pay tribute and submit to Roman laws as long as he is allowed to retain the kingship. Constantius agrees to these terms, but Coel dies one month later. Constantius marries Coel's daughter, Helena, and crowns himself as Coel's successor. Helena subsequently gives birth to a son who becomes the Emperor Constantine the Great, giving a British pedigree to the Roman imperial line.

Local tradition came to suggest that Coel was responsible for some of the ancient buildings in Colchester; a public conduit in the High Street was named "King Coel's Pump", the Balkerne Gate in the Roman town walls was known as "King Coel's Castle" and the remains of the Temple of Claudius over which Colchester Castle was built were called "King Coel's Palace".

== Bibliography ==
- Bensusan-Butt, John (2009). Essex in the Age of Enlightenment. Lulu.com. ISBN 978-1445210544.
- Bromwich, Rachel (2006). Trioedd Ynys Prydein: The Triads of the Island of Britain. University of Wales Press. ISBN 0-7083-1386-8.
- Henry of Huntingdon (1996). Greenway, Diana (ed.). Historia Anglorum: The History of the English People. Oxford University Press. ISBN 0-19-822224-6.
- Harbus, Antonina (2002). Helena of Britain in Medieval Legend. D. S. Brewer. ISBN 0859916251.
- Koch, John T. (2006). Celtic Culture: A Historical Encyclopedia. ABC-CLIO. ISBN 1-85109-440-7.
- MacQuarrie, Alan (1993). "The Kings of Strathclyde : c.400 - 1018". In Grant, A.; Stringer, K (eds.). Medieval Scotland : Crown, Lordship and Community : essays presented to G.W.S.Barrow. Edinburgh University Press. pp. 1–19. ISBN 9780748611102.
- Morris, John (1973). The Age of Arthur. Weidenfeld & Nicolson.
- Opie, I.; Opie, P. (1997). The Oxford Dictionary of Nursery Rhymes. Oxford University Press.
- Geoffrey of Monmouth (1966). Thorpe, Lewis (ed.). The History of the Kings of Britain. Penguin. ISBN 0-14-044170-0.

Legendary titles
Preceded by Asclepiodotus	King of Britain	Succeeded by Constantius
