= Bonedd Gwŷr y Gogledd =

Middle Welsh genealogical tract

- "The Descent of the Men of the North"
- Author(s): anonymous
- Language: Middle Welsh
- Principal manuscript(s): NLW, Peniarth MS 45, fos. 291v-292r (late 13th century)
- Genre: genealogy
- Personages: pedigrees of Coel Hen and Dyfnwal Hen

Bonedd Gwŷr y Gogledd (English: The Descent of the Men of the North) is a brief Middle Welsh tract which claims to give the pedigrees of twenty 6th century rulers of the Hen Ogledd, the Brittonic-speaking parts of southern Scotland and northern England. It is attested in a number of manuscripts, the earliest being NLW, Peniarth MS 45, which has been dated to the late 13th century. The text may have been composed in the 12th century. The historicity of much of the information is spurious or in doubt. Although certain parts are in agreement with the earlier Harleian genealogies, the text represents a substantial revision seeking to integrate the branches of many rulers and heroes who are prominent in other traditions, such as the Rheged prince Llywarch Hen.

== Contents ==
The text consists chiefly of two sections, each of which seeks to trace the lineages of sixth-century rulers to a common ancestor. The first section is concerned with the Coeling or descendants of Coel Hen, including the houses of Rheged and Eidyn. The second takes Dyfnwal Hen as its ancestor figure, who is here identified as a grandson of the Roman emperor Magnus Maximus. A confused genealogy of Áedán mac Gabráin, ruler of the Gaelic kingdom of Dál Riata, appears, though here (as in other medieval Welsh sources) Áedán is given as the father, rather than son, of Gabrán mac Domangairt.

In between the two main genealogies, the tract also includes a Welsh triad, referring to the three items of weaponry and armour which never failed in battle: the 300 swords of the Cynferching (descendants of Cynfarch Oer), the 300 shields of the Cynwydion (descendants of Cynwyd) and the 300 spears of the Coeling. The text concludes with a final line on the parentage of Huallu, son of Tudfwlch Cor(n)eu (prince of Cornwall) and Dywanw, daughter of Amlawd Wledic.

=== Coel Hen ===
Coel
Ceneu
Gorwst Letlwm	Mar
Meirchiawn	Arthwys
Cynfarch	Elidyr Lydanwyn	Cynfelyn	Pabo "Pillar of Britain"	Eliffer	Ceidyn
Urien (§ 1); Rheged	Llywarch Hen (§ 2); Rheged	Cynnwyd	Dunawd (§ 4)	Cerwyd (§ 4)	Sawyl (§ 4)	Gwrgi (§ 5)	Peredur (§ 5)	Gwendoleu (§ 6)	Nudd (§ 6)	Cof (§ 6)
Clydno Eidyn (§ 3); Eidyn	Cynan Genhir (§ 3)	Cynfelyn Drwsgl (§ 3)	Cynfawr Hadgadduc (§ 3)	Cadrawd Calchfynydd (§ 3)

=== Dyfnwal Hen of Alt Clut ===
Magnus Maximus
Idnyued
Dyfnwal Hen
Kedic	Garmonyawn	Aedan Uradawc	Gorwst Priodawr
Tudwal Tudelyd	Serfan	Cawrdaf	Gabhran (§ 11)	Elidyr Mwynfawr (§ 12)
Rhydderch Hael (§ 8)	Mordaf (§ 9)	Gwyddno
Elffin (§ 10)

== See also ==
- Harleian genealogies
- Genealogies from Jesus College MS 20
- Book of Baglan

== Sources ==
- Koch, John T. (2006). "Cynwydion". In Koch, John T. (ed.). Celtic Culture: A Historical Encyclopedia. Santa Barbara. pp. 541–542.

=== Editions and translations ===
- Bromwich, Rachel, ed. (1991) [1978]. "Appendix II". Trioedd Ynys Prydein: the Triads of the Island of Britain. Cardiff: University of Wales Press. pp. 238–239.
- Fitzpatrick-Matthews, Keith, ed. (2006). "Bonhed Gwyr y Gogled yn hav". (online edition; not peer-reviewed).
