= Urien Rheged =

Sixth-century ruler of Rheged

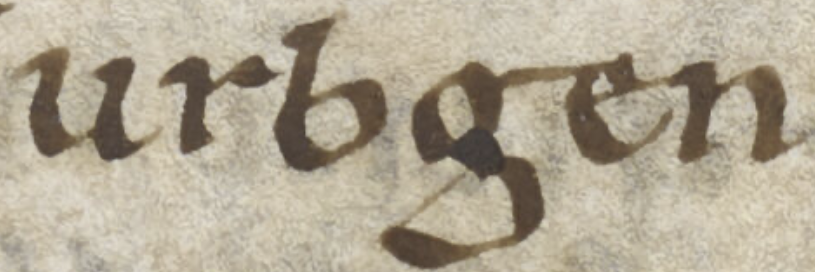
- Urien's name, from the copy of the Historia Brittonum found in Harley MS 3859, f. 188v

King of Rheged?
- Reign: c. 550? – 572 x 592/after 597?
- Predecessor: Cynfarch Oer?
- Successor: Owain ab Urien?
- Born: c. 520
- Died: c. 572 x 592/after 597? Aber Lleu (Ross Low, Northumberland) (Note: One 'Aber Lleu' (mouth of the river Lleu) is mentioned as the spot where Urien is murdered in some of the later material concerning the man. Jenny Rowland rejects Ifor William's identification of Aber Lleu with Ross Low opposite Lindisfarne, citing the dialectical English word low meaning 'a shallow pool left in the sand by the receding tide'. This place-name element occurs repeatedly in other Northumbrian place-names. See Rowland 1990, p. 91, n. 62, for discussion on the name, p. 423, 'Efrddyl' §30–31 for mention of the place in the text. Patrick Sims-Williams finds this argument unconvincing, as it is 'too much to be coincidence, especially considering that the poet's Early Old Welsh form of Lleu would presumably have been Lou.' Instead, Sims-Williams derives the 'Low' in Ross Low from the Brittonic word behind Welsh llwch, Old Welsh luch 'lake, pool, stagnant water, marsh,' which is loaned into the very English of that area in the Lindisfarne Gospels as luh glossing Latin fretum 'strait, sound, channel' and stagnum 'pond, swamp, fen, pool.' The loss of final -ch from Welsh to English is because Old English would have weakened the sound to -h and then lost it entirely. See Sims-Williams 1996, pp. 39–41.)
- Cause of death: Assassination
- Spouse: Morgan (Arthurian legend); Modron (Welsh legend)
- Issue: Children in early sources: Owain ab Urien (Ywain); Rhun ab Urien; Pasgen ab Urien; Elffin ab Urien; Children in late sources: Rhiwallon ab Urien; Morfudd ferch Urien
- Dynasty: Cynferchyn (Coeling?) (Note: The name of Urien's kindred is variously spelt as Cynferchyn, Cynferching, or Cynfeirching depending on the source. Cynfeirching reflects 'double i-affection', with the vowel -e- changed to -ei- because of the -i- following it, while Cynferchyn/Cynferching does not, and is more common. For examples of these names, see Rowland 1990, pp. 93, 94, 98, 587 for 'Cynferchyn', but 119, 238 for 'Cynfeirching'; Guy 2020a, p. 483. Ben Guy uses 'Cynferchyn', but the editors of Cyfres Beirdd y Tywysogion (following Cynddelw Brydydd Mawr) use 'Cynferching'. See Jones & Parry Owen 1991, p. 61, poem 5, line 66. On 'double affection', see Jackson 1953, pp. 591–592 On the Welsh dynastic suffix -in/-yn/-yng, either derived from a native Proto-Celtic *-icn- or from Old English -ingas, see Sims-Williams 2003, pp. 157–158.)
- Father: Cynfarch Oer ap Meirchion Gul
- Mother: Nefyn ferch Brychan Brycheiniog (legendary)
- Military career
- Conflicts Battles: Migration-period Britain Battle of Alclud Ford; Battle of Argoed Llwyfain; Battle of Catraeth? (c. 570?); Battle of Gwen Ystrad

Urien ap Cynfarch Oer or Urien Rheged (Welsh pronunciation: [ˈɨ̞riɛn ˈr̥ɛɡɛd] (Note: , Old Welsh: Urbgen or Urbagen, Old Welsh pronunciation: [ɨ̞rβ(ə)ˈɣɛn])) was a powerful sixth-century Brittonic-speaking figure who was possibly the ruler of the territory or kingdom known as Rheged. He is one of the best-known and best documented of the British figures of the Old North. (Note: Yr Hen Ogledd or 'the Old North' is a term coined by modern scholarship to refer to the formerly British Celtic-speaking regions in what is today the north of England and south of Scotland, which loomed large in the literature of later medieval Wales and stories about which helped to form Welsh self-conceptions of identity in the Middle Ages. Marged Haycock says: "[t]he term gained currency from the late 1960s: ‘the old North’ is used by J. E. Caerwyn Williams [in 1968]... but neither this nor the Welsh phrase was used by Ifor Williams in the original Welsh edition in 1960. Elsewhere, Ifor Williams used Gogledd Coll (the Lost North) [in 1938]... [t]he term ‘British North’ used in the first edition of the triads in 1961 is replaced by yr Hen Ogledd and Old North in subsequent editions." See Haycock 2020, p. 54, note 9.) His kingdom was most likely centred around the Solway Firth. (Note: This is based upon an off-hand remark in a poem by the twelfth-century poet Hywel ab Owain Gwynedd to an imaginary journey to '[C]aer Lliwelyt' in 'Reged' and an obscure reference to the 'Merin Reget' in a thirteenth-century prophecy attributed to Taliesin. See Charles-Edwards 2013, p. 10. The reference in the latter poem is Dydyccawt eniwet / tra Merin Reget; / perif perchen ket / gwledychawt yn Eluet; / hael hydyr y dylif, / goruawr y gynnif. / Wrth awyr volif / Katwaladyr gweith heinif. 'He will carry suffering beyond the Firth of Rheged; a lord (who is the) owner of gift(s) shall rule in Elfed; a generous one, strong his strategy, mighty his struggle. To the skies shall I praise Cadwaladr, energetic in battle.' See Haycock 2013a, pp. 158–159, poem 8, lines 79–86. In a different paper, Haycock suggests that 'merin Rheged' is paralleled in the mention of Llywelyn ab Iorwerth going 'tra merin' in a poem by Elidir Sais, which may perhaps be an oblique reference to his joining a campaign of King John of England (Llywelyn's overlord and eventual father-in-law) against the Scots in 1209. See Haycock 2013b, note 32. The former reference to Rheged by Hywel ab Owain Gwynedd is as follows: Arglwyt nef a llaỽr, Gwaỽr Gwyndodyt, / Mor bell o Geri Gaer Lliwelyt! / Esgynneis ar uelyn o Uaelyenyt / Hyd y nhir Reged rỽg nos a dyt. 'Lord of heaven and earth, Prince of the men of Gwynedd, how far from Ceri [is] Carlisle! I rode on a yellow [horse] from Maelienydd until the land of Rheged, between night and day.' See Bramley & Owen 1994, p. 119, poem 6, lines 34–37.) According to the section known as the "Northern History" of the Historia Brittonum (c. 829–30 AD), Urien gained a decisive advantage in a conflict against the Anglo-Saxons in northern Britain while leading an alliance with three other kings: Rhydderch Hen, Gwallog ap Llênog, and Morgan. The alliance led by Urien penned the Anglo-Saxons in at Lindisfarne, though this siege came to an abrupt end when Urien was murdered on the orders of his erstwhile ally Morgan.

The most secure evidence for his existence comes the Historia Brittonum and eight praise-poems in Middle Welsh orthography dedicated to him surviving in a fourteenth-century manuscript. Despite their being found in later orthography, the poems may possibly reflect early material, even material contemporaneous to Urien. One of these poems is explicitly attributed to the famed poet Taliesin in the manuscript. (Note: This poem is 'Yspeil Taliessin', see Gwenogvryn Evans 1910, pp. 62·16, 63·16. Note that Gwenogvryn's notes and 'translation' are hopelessly speculative, and were very negatively received by subsequent scholars, with John Morris-Jones even describing his interpretation as 'one huge mistake'. See Morris-Jones 1918, p. 149. Despite the deficiencies in Gwenogvryn Evans' translation and notes, his is a good facsimile of the Book of Taliesin, but his notes and interpretation should not at all be regarded as reliable. See Williams 1968, p. xv.) The "Northern History" in the Historia Brittonum also roughly synchronises Taliesin's career to the reign of Ida of Bernicia (547 × 549). Some of the Beirdd y Tywysogion (c. 1100–1283) also allude to this strong association between Taliesin and Urien. The panegyric attributed to Taliesin concerning Urien is particularly significant because if it truly originates in the sixth century it, together with the poetry attributed to Aneirin, would be the earliest vernacular post-Classical European literature.

Early material concerning Urien characterises him as a ferocious warrior and a major political figure of his time, conquering Picts, Anglo-Saxons, and Britons of the 'Old North' alike. However, the poems attributed to Taliesin do not include much biographical information about the man. According to the interpretation of John Koch, Urien may also have been the leader of the force opposing the warriors commemorated in the similarly possibly sixth-century poem known as the Gododdin who were killed in the Battle of Catraeth. In addition to this material, Urien and his family feature heavily elsewhere in other medieval literature from Wales.

Outside of the Welsh context, he was later transformed in Arthurian legend into the figure of king Urien of Garlot or Gorre. His son, Owain, likewise lent his name to Ywain.

== Problems of interpretation ==
As with almost all figures of the early Middle Ages in Britain, the greatest difficulty when attempting to reconstruct Urien's life and career is how to interpret and reconcile our varied, late, and sometimes obscure, corrupt, or confused sources. The only place associated with him which can be located securely is the place of his besieging of Theodric, which was Lindisfarne. (Note: This is because the name the Historia Brittonum gives the place where Theodric was besieged is the same as where it records Cuthbert as dying, who was bishop of Lindisfarne, though in reality Cuthbert did not die there but rather on Inner Farne. See Morris 1980, pp. 79–80, §63, 65.) (Note: For an overview of place-names in the Urien material, see Haycock 2020, pp. 54–59.) (Note: For problems with the place-name 'Yrechwydd' (apparently a core region of Urien's) specifically, see Russell 2020.) Nevertheless, the other places which appear in conjunction with him are generally identified with places in the north of England and south of Scotland.

Another difficulty with outlining Urien's career is that the poetry to him contained in the fourteenth-century Book of Taliesin, possibly from his own time, does not contain much in the way of narrative or readily usable information about Urien and his deeds; instead, it ambiguously recalls events and extols Urien's virtues, leaving scholars to piece together any kind of reconstruction of events. Likewise, beyond a general dating of the late sixth century, Urien's date of death (which is not memorialised in surviving panegyric) is very difficult to establish because of the confused chronology of the Historia Brittonum. Since this text has such difficulties, modern scholarship suggests Urien's death could have happened as early as 572 AD to as late as after Augustine's mission to the Kingdom of Kent in 597. Setting problems of the interpretation of the material concerning Urien aside, it is clear that he was (or at least was taken to be in later times) a very important figure of the late sixth century, but because of these difficulties, it is best to judge each surviving source concerning him individually rather than smooth over problems or contradictions with each to create a cohesive narrative combining them all.

== Early Welsh material ==
=== Material found in Harley MS 3859 ===
The earliest material giving evidence of Urien is to be found in Harley MS 3859, a manuscript copied c. 1100 in Saint Augustine's, Canterbury, or in an associated centre, possibly even across the Channel. Together with various Classical texts, it contains the Harleian genealogies as well as a copy of the Historia Brittonum (written in 829-30 in Gwynedd) and the Annales Cambriae. This manuscript is celebrated among Welsh manuscripts because of its early date and the material concerning the early Middle Ages found within it. The Welsh material in Harley 3859 probably was compiled together in the exemplar of this manuscript, which was most likely written around 954 at St Davids in the reign of Owain ap Hywel Dda. The genealogies were probably first composed before 872 in Gwynedd at the court of Owain's ancestor Rhodri Mawr to support the legitimacy of this dynasty to rule over Gwynedd and the Isle of Man.

==== The Harleian Genealogies ====
Urien's genealogy in Harley MS 3859 gives his patrilineal descent as "Urien son of Cynfarch son of Meirchion son of Gwrwst son of Coel Hen." (Note: HG[§8] [U]rbgen map Cinmarc map Meirchia[un] map Gurgust map Coil Hen. On this, see Guy 2020a, p. 335 for Urien's patriline just cited, and chapter 2 for the dating of the genealogies.) His earliest recorded ancestor, Coel Hen, functioned as an origin point for many of the northern Brittonic-speaking dynasties of the early Middle Ages in northern Britain. In modern scholarship, it is not generally held that Coel was an important historic figure or truly the ancestor of all these families, especially those extraneous dynasties given descent from him in the much later fifteenth century genealogical tracts titled Bonedd Gwŷr y Gogledd. Since the "Coeling" first appear in genealogies together in Harley MS 3859 with the Historia Brittonum, which narrates the end of Urien's career, it is thought the compiler of the genealogies joined together the lineages of all the Brittonic-speaking leaders mentioned in the Historia Brittonum to add context to the narrative. Nothing is known of Urien's father Cynfarch, though he may have ruled over Rheged since later material makes reference to the family of the Cynferchyn (i.e., descendants of Cynfarch), which suggests he was important enough to be treated as an ancestor-figure. (Note: See Jones & Parry Owen 1991, pp. 61, poem 5, line 66, and 298, poem 24, line 153 It has been asserted that Urien was a (possibly Pictish!) interloper, therefore, Cynferch may never have ruled. See Parker 2022, pp. 17–21.)

==== Narrative in the Historia Brittonum ====
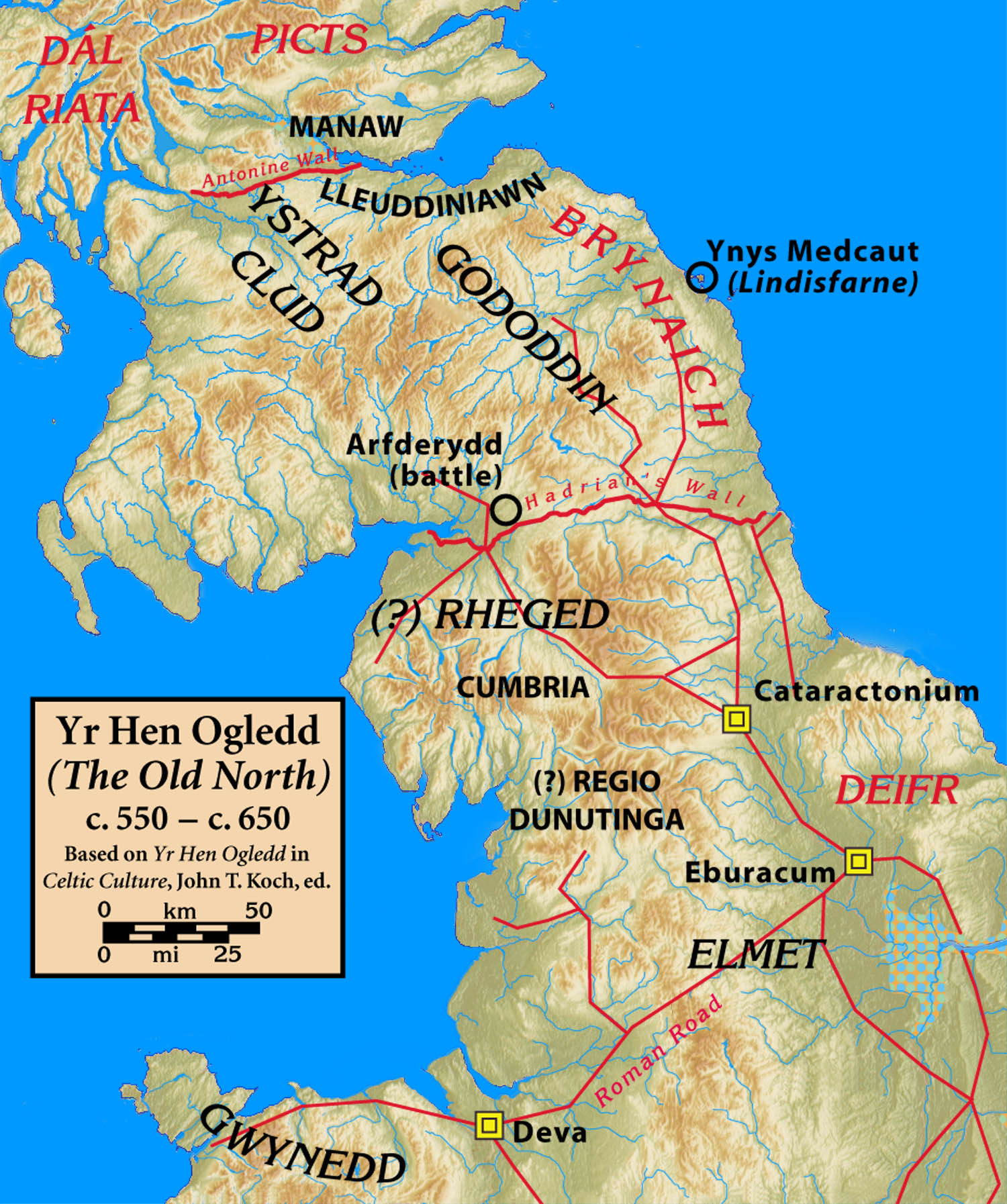
Places mentioned in early Welsh sources concerning Urien's period

Contra ill[os] quattuor reges, Urbgen, et Riderchhen, et Guallauc, et Morcant, dimicaverunt. Deodric contra illum Urbgen cum filiis dimicabat fortiter. In illo autem tempore aliquando hostes, nunc cives vincebantur, et ipse conclusit eos tribus diebus et tribus noctibus in insula Metcaud et, dum erat in expeditione, jugulatus est, Morcanto destinante pro invidia, quia in ipso prae omnibus regibus virtus maxima erat instauratione belli. (Note: While John Morris' edition, following that of Theodor Mommsen, does read illum 'against him', Patrick Sims-Williams notes that this is an emendation of the original text, which reads illos 'against them'. See Sims-Williams 1996, pp. 31–32.)

Against them [i.e. Hussa and his predecessors] four kings fought: Urien, and Rhydderch Hen, and Gwallog, and Morgan. Theodric used to fight bravely against that Urien with his sons, yet at that time sometimes the enemies, sometimes the citizens used to be vanquished. And he [Urien] shut them [the enemies] up for three days and three nights in the island of Lindisfarne and, while he was on [this?] campaign, he was slain at the instigation of Morgan out of jealousy, because beyond all other kings he [Urien] had the greatest skill in renewing war.

— 'Nennius', Historia Brittonum §63, translation by Patrick Sims-Williams.

The Historia Brittonum is our only "historical" record of Urien, though its usefulness for reconstructing history is often doubted, as it was compiled and adapted hundreds of years after Urien's death from various sources. (Note: See the essays (especially I and II) in Dumville 1990. For a recent speculative critical assessment of the Historia Brittonum, see Parker 2022.) Interestingly, in a later prologue attached to the text, the author of the Historia Brittonum claims to have assembled his text based on the work of Rhun, Urien's son, who is also credited with baptising Edwin of Northumbria in 637, together with (or identical to) Paulinus of York, though the existence of Rhun's text is debated. (Note: On the invalidity of attributing the text to 'Nennius', see Dumville 1990. For an objection to this rejection of Nennian authorship, see Guy 2015.) Based on Bede and a Northumbrian source David Dumville called "the Anglian collection of royal genealogies and regnal lists", the text synchronises Urien's life to the reign of Theodric (r. 572-579) and Hussa of Bernicia (r. 585-92).

In this narrative, Urien took hostile action against Theodric, together with Rhydderch Hen, Gwallog ap Llênog, and Morgan, who are (excluding Rhydderch) all recorded as descendants of Coel in the genealogies contained in the same manuscript. The meaning of "with his sons" in the second line is also problematic, as it is uncertain whether this line refers to Urien's sons, or those of Hussa, though it is generally understood that those of Hussa are intended. Echoing Gildas, it is said that the conflict between the Britons and the Saxons went back and forth, but Urien and his allies eventually gained the upper hand and besieged Theodric on Lindisfarne (Old Welsh: Medcaut). Urien was killed at the instigation of Morgan, who, according to the author of the Historia Brittonum, was jealous of Urien's martial ability. As Morgan is supposed to have come from Bernicia, a nearby territory to Lindisfarne, it has been suggested that Morgan at that moment felt more as threatened by Urien's powerful presence near his home than by the weakened Theodric.

Hussa (not just Theodric) is directly described as Urien's foe in the first sentence, which leads to difficulties of interpretation. Kenneth Jackson suggested this meant either that Urien fought against Theodric and Hussa before the latter's reign or that the chronology here is wrong and that the narrative refers to the reigns of Ida's sons in general. Ian Lovecy understood the reference to Theodric as a long parenthesis indicating that formerly the struggle went both ways, but not in Urien's last campaign against Hussa. David Dumville understood the text to refer to the warfare of all four British kings against the five English kings previously named in the Historia Brittonum besides Hussa, that is, from the reigns of Adda to Hussa. The next king is Æthelfrith, who took the throne c. 593, and so Urien could even have died as late as this. However, the section of the Historia Brittonum preceding this narrative records the Christianisation of Kent (occurring in 596-7) as occurring in the reign of Frithuwald (reigned 579-85), implying Urien's campaigns could even have been after 597. This is one of many places in the Historia Brittonum with a confused chronology. For this reason, Patrick Sims-Williams cast doubt on the reliability of the chronology concerning Urien and his campaigns against the Anglo-Saxons, leaving the date of Urien's death an open question.

=== Poetry to Urien in the Book of Taliesin ===
Much like many cultures in north-western Europe during Late Antiquity, medieval Welsh culture valued praise-poetry, or poems praising the virtues of a leading political figure. (Note: While associated with the Romantic idea of the 'bard' for many hundreds of years now, one finds this occupation among Romans as well, e.g. Sidonius Apollinaris' panegyric to Avitus, or Venantius Fortunatus' praise-poems to various Merovingian dynasts, all in Latin. See Sims-Williams 1984.) Urien has the almost unique distinction of having a sizeable body of possibly contemporaneous poems dedicated to him in the Book of Taliesin (Peniarth MS 2), a Middle Welsh manuscript of the early fourteenth century. Twelve poems in this manuscript are taken to be "historical", that is, possibly reflecting genuine sixth-century material and devoid of supernatural or gnomic content. The eight poems in this manuscript which address Urien are:

- 'Arwyre gwyr katraeth gan dyd'
- 'Uryen yr echwyd'
- 'Eg gorffowys can rychedwys'
- 'Ar vn blyned'
- 'Gweith argoet llwyfein'
- 'Ardwyre reget ryssed rieu'
- 'Yspeil Taliessin'
- 'Dadolwch Vryen'

The other 'historic' poems are a poem to Cynan Garwyn, one to Owain ab Urien, and two to Gwallog ap Llênog. The dating of these poems is still hotly debated between those who see the poems as reflecting early material, and those who favour a later date. (Note: For an overview of the different positions on these poems, see Rodway 2013, p. 14. Only the poems edited by Ifor Williams as numbers II and VI have been rejected as authentic to an early period on linguistic grounds, though not without objections.) Only one poem of these twelve, 'Yspeil Taliessin', is explicitly attributed to Urien's court poet Taliesin in the manuscript, but since Taliesin was strongly associated with Urien in later medieval Welsh literature, and the bulk of the content of the manuscript is to do with Taliesin, the name of the book has stuck. (Note: For the enduring association of Taliesin with Urien, see, e.g. the reference to them made by Cynddelw Brydydd Mawr in the twelfth century: Ny bu warthlef kert Kynuerching werin / O benn Talyessin, bartrin beirtrig 'The verse of the host of the Cynferching was not derisive from the mouth of Taleisin, [who had] the poetic learning of the company of bards'. The 'Cynferching' were the descendants of Cynfarch Oer, Urien's father, so this is an allusion to Urien. See Jones & Parry Owen 1991, p. 298, poem 24, line 153-4n.)

Seven of the "historical" poems to Urien (including 'Yspeil Taliessin') end with the same 'refrain', so it would appear that they were seen as works of Taliesin in the Middle Ages as well. Taliesin is mentioned in the Historia Brittonum, though his life is synchronised to the reign of Ida of Bernicia (547 x 559), slightly before Urien's reign. It is not likely that Taliesin would have been only active for twelve years, but this may be when he began to be famed for poetry, though this is another example of the difficult chronology throughout the text. Taliesin was very well known for his poetic skill in later medieval Wales, and all sorts of legends sprang up about him attributing to him magic powers, including many poems "in character" attributed to him, and these poems form the bulk of the manuscript. (Note: For an edition and translation of the legendary poetry, see Haycock 2007. For the prophecies in the voice of Taliesin, see Haycock 2013a. Urien is not the focus of any of the legendary poetry.) Taliesin's "transformation" from a poet to an omniscient wizard is paralleled by the development of the legend of Virgil in the Continent, who also was attributed magic powers in folklore and literature because of his poetic skill.

These poems are in sometimes obscure language and do not offer very much in the way of clear biographical information about Urien. Much of the place-name evidence of these poems is understood to refer to places in modern-day Cumbria, though Urien is also said to have led battle in the area of the River Ayr, in the Brittonic-speaking kingdom of Strathclyde, and perhaps against the Picts. He is also recorded as fighting against the English, much like he is said to have done in the Historia Brittonum. One poem mentions Urien and Owain as having fought a certain Fflamddwyn (meaning 'flame-bearing'), which has been traditionally identified as a kenning referring to one of Ida's sons, perhaps even Theodric. Owain ab Urien is praised for killing Fflanddwyn alongside a "broad host of English" in another poem, and the practice of giving Welsh nicknames to early Northern Anglo-Saxon kings is common in the Historia Brittonum. One dadolwch, or reconciliation-poem, also survives, implying that Taliesin ran afoul of Urien at some point and was obliged to get back into his good graces.

==== The date of the panegyric to Urien ====
The poems attributed to Taliesin are of particular interest because they could represent the earliest vernacular literature in Europe in the Middle Ages, even as they survive in a late manuscript. John Koch has suggested that Urien's son Rhun (fl. c. 627), who is credited as a source in the Historia Brittonum, may have also been involved with the recording and writing down of some of the poetry to his father. John Morris-Jones argued that all the poetry to Urien, Owain, and Gwallog were genuinely sixth-century in his criticism of J. G. Evans' edition of the Book of Taliesin in 1918, which was followed by Ifor Williams in his edition of the poems. This early date has been criticised by various scholars since Morris-Jones' time, with many suggesting they instead were created in the ninth century or later. Despite this, there has been no definitive linguistic argument that they are later than Urien's time, though this does not mean that they are definitely from the sixth-century, either.

== Urien and the Battle of Catraeth ==
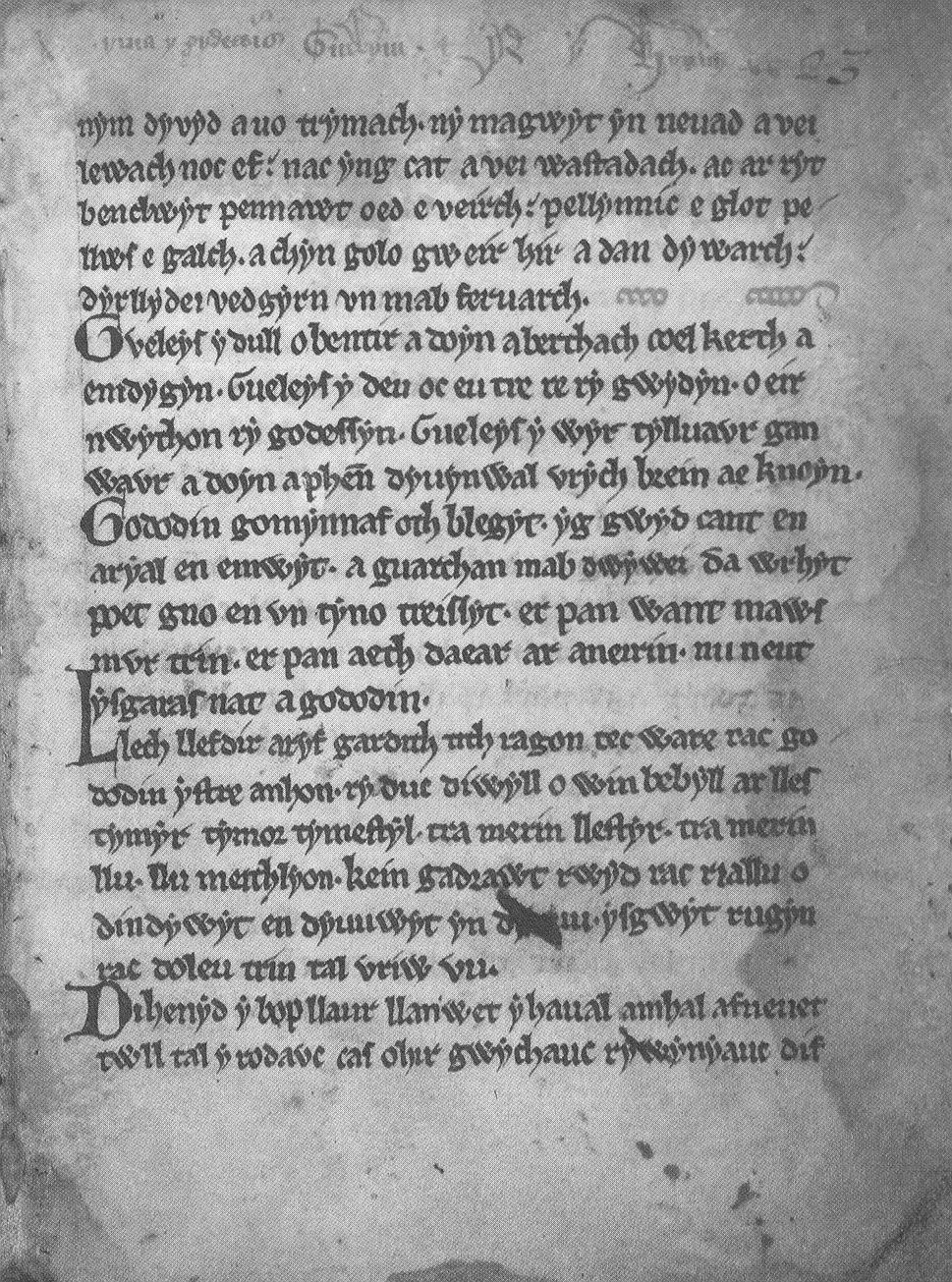
The Book of Aneirin, page 23: the so-called 'Reciter's Prologue' to the Gododdin

In addition to Taliesin, the sole other early Welsh poet to whom surviving poetry is attributed is Aneirin. Aneirin is credited as the author of the Gododdin, a collection of elegies surviving in a thirteenth-century manuscript for warriors who were slain in the Battle of Catraeth in the latter half of the sixth century AD. The warriors commemorated in the poem are uniformly Brittonic-speaking, and their enemies are described as eingyl (Angles), saesson (Saxons), and deor/dewr or deivyr (Deirans). For this reason, the poem is traditionally understood, both in the Middle Ages and in most modern scholarship, to have commemorated a battle between Brittonic-speaking warriors led by a king of the Gododdin and the Anglo-Saxons who had begun to settle the north-eastern coast of Britain. According to this interpretation of the text, the confrontation was on by the recent conquest by the Anglo-Saxons of the old Roman fort of Cataractonium (giving Catraeth in Welsh), which was situated on an important crossroads. However, John Koch's commentary on the Gododdin radically challenges this interpretation, and places Urien as the leader of the forces opposing the figures commemorated in the Gododdin at Catraeth in c. 570 AD.

Despite the importance of the testimony of the Gododdin for the sixth century, its age and the date of its composition is still under debate, moreso than the Taliesin material, since it is found as a composite text in the thirteenth-century Book of Aneirin. The 'B'-text of the Gododdin, in older orthography than the 'A'-text, is copied from two particularly archaic sources, though it is difficult to date these exemplars any earlier than the tenth century with certainty. It is not impossible that the most archaic stratum of the B-text called B^{2} by John Koch could go back to the sixth century, together with other kernels of the Gododdin.

=== References to Catraeth outside the Gododdin ===
There are two references to Catraeth in the poetry concerning Urien attributed to Taliesin. The opening line of the second poem in Ifor Williams's edition is [a]rwyre gwyr katraeth gan dyd, 'the men of Catraeth arise with the day'. In this poem, the 'men of Catraeth' are described as following Urien on his various campaigns, and the poem makes reference to a certain 'Battle of Gwen Ystrad'. The narrator in 'Yspeil Taliesin' also says gweleis i lyw katraeth tra maeu 'I saw the lord of Catraeth [i.e. Urien] across the plains'.

John Koch reconstructed 'Arwyre gwyr katraeth gan dyd' in what it should have looked like in sixth-century Common Brittonic and judged the poem to be authentic to this period based on his understanding that it contains fossilised forms of words which reflect the Brittonic language before it lost case endings in the mid-sixth century. He also referenced another poem, 'Moliant Cadwallon', probably a genuine seventh-century panegyric to Cadwallon ap Cadfan, which says "Fierce Gwallog caused the greatly renowned death toll at Catraeth". This Gwallog is presumably Gwallog ap Llênog, the ruler of Elmet who fought alongside Urien against the Anglo-Saxons in the narrative of the Historia Brittonum discussed above.

=== John Koch's reconstruction of the Battle of Catraeth ===
Just as there are references to Catraeth outside of the Gododdin, so there appears to be a reference to Urien and Gwallog in it. One stanza begins:

O vreithyell gatraeth pan adrodir.
maon dychiorant eu hoet bu hir.
edyrn diedyrn amygyn dir.
a meibyon godebawc gwerin enwir.
dyforthynt lynwyssawr gelorawr hir.

It is concerning Catraeth’s variegated and ruddy [land] that it is told —
the followers fell; long were the lamentations for them,
the immortalised men; [but] it was not as immortals that they fought for territory
against the descendants of Godebog, the rightful faction:
long biers bore off blood-stained bodies.

The 'descendants of Godebog' here could refer to Urien and Gwallog, as another epithet of Coel Hen, their shared ancestor, is Godebog, meaning 'protector'. Rachel Bromwich supported an emendation of this line, deleting the preposition a 'with'. This would make the line mean "not as undying men did the descendants of Godebog fight for the land" and suggests the descendants of Godebog were allies of the heroes of the Gododdin. However, John Koch rejected this emendation on the grounds that it would leave the line a syllable short of the ten syllable metre of in the stanza. Therefore, according to Koch, 'Arwyre gwyr katraeth gan dyd', the Gododdin, and 'Moliant Cadwallon' all refer to the same Battle of Catraeth, with Urien and Gwallog opposing a force made up of the Gododdin forces and a contingent from Strathclyde under Cynon ap Clydno.

The impetus for the battle in Koch's understanding of events is linked to the presence of one Madog Elfed among the commemorated heroes of the Gododdin. His epithet implies he was a royal of Elfed (like Urien Rheged), and so he may have been a claimant to rule the region supported by the Gododdin and in opposition to Gwallog and Urien. As the quickest route from Gododdin to Elfed would pass through Catraeth, the battle therefore was a result of the forces of Urien cutting off the Gododdin force at the important crossroads there. The presence of the Anglo-Saxons, Koch argues, can be understood as representing Urien's overlordship over the Anglo-Saxons of Deira, with the Bernicians having been allied with the Gododdin force. Since the Bernicians are conspicuously absent from the enemies of the Gododdin in the poem, and likewise are the Deirans from the poetry surrounding Urien and in the narrative in the Historia Brittonum, Koch argued that the element of racial warfare in the poem is secondary to the composition of the text, after the loss of Britain to the English was cemented in the Welsh mind.

=== Receptions of Koch's hypothesis ===
While Koch's textual reconstruction of the Gododdin in sixth-century Welsh was lauded as being accomplished and accurate, the date he proposed for the Gododdin, his historical background for the battle, and his account of the transmission of the text remain controversial, since Koch postulates an early written version of the Gododdin as having been created in Strathclyde in the seventh century. In particular, Graham R. Isaac strongly rejected Koch's date for 'Arwyre gwyr katraeth gan dyd', and dated this poem to between 1050 and 1150 based on the metrically important prosthetic vowel in the words ystrat and ystadyl in one line of the poem. Were this the case, Koch's understanding of the background, transmission, and historical importance of the Gododdin would be severely damaged, and while his is not the mainstream opinion on the text, debate on this matter still continues.

== Later Welsh material ==
=== Saga poetry and Canu Urien ===
Because of his appearance in early poetry and central place in the narrative of the Historia Brittonum, Urien became a figure in the body of later Welsh literature concerning the "Old North", which functioned as the setting for much medieval Welsh literature. One such piece of literature concerning Urien, or more accurately Urien's sons, is fittingly called the "Urien Rheged" cycle (Welsh: Canu Urien) by modern scholars, as the poems are concerned with the events in Rheged after the killing of Urien. The poems survive mainly from two Middle Welsh manuscripts, the Black Book of Carmarthen (c. 1250) and the Red Book of Hergest (after 1382). Nevertheless, Canu Urien is generally understood to be a copy of Old Welsh-period material, dated to around the same period as the Historia Brittonum. This material is called 'saga poetry' by comparison with Icelandic sagas, because like the Icelandic material, the Welsh poems are thought to have been taken from longer, partly prose (or oral) works, and because they both might reflect earlier history through a literary lens.

Though one of Urien's allies in the narrative of the Historia Brittonum was Gwallog ap Llênog, he is recorded as having fought against Urien's son Elffin in another one of the poems in this cycle, "Dwy Blaid". Likewise, one Dunod fought with Owain, while Brân ab Ymellyrn and Morgan – the orderer of Urien's killing – fought the narrator. The identification of the narrator of these poems has been the subject of some debate. Ifor Williams understood him to be Llywarch Hen, Urien's cousin and the subject of his own cycle of poems lamenting his old age. Jenny Rowland thought he must be some other figure, perhaps one of Urien's nephews by his sister Efrddyl, since their grief may be emphasised because of their conflicting ties of kindred, and in view of the fact that Llywarch was not in her eyes a heroic figure. In response to this, Patrick Sims-Williams put forth powerful arguments based on the text and its history to identify the narrator with Llywarch Hen after all. Chief among these are the fact that the narrator addresses Urien as keuynderw 'first cousin', and that the weight of evidence about Llywarch in the eyes of later medieval Welshmen suggests they viewed him as a great warrior, even if he suffered in old age.

The most impactful and moving poems from this cycle are given the titles 'Pen Urien' (Urien's Head) and 'Celain Urien' (Urien's corpse) by modern scholarship. They relate the immediate aftermath of Urien's killing, with the name of the assassin given in another poem as Llofan Llaw Ddifro. In 'Pen Urien' and 'Celain Urien', the narrator was forced to finish Urien off and strike off his head, with the implication that it was unsafe to carry Urien's entire body home for burial. The narrator laments his fortune that he must leave the body of his caring lord behind and curses his hand for carrying out this grim task.

Canu Urien §§7–27, 'Pen Urien' and 'Celain Urien' (Red Book of Hergest) (Note: Text and translation taken from Rowland 1990, pp. 420–22, 477–478.)
| 'Pen Urien' (Welsh) | English translation | 'Celain Urien' (Welsh) | English translation |
|---|---|---|---|
| Penn a borthaf ar [uyn] tu. bu kyrchynat rwng deulu. mab kynuarch balch bieiuu. | I carry a head on my side: he was an attacker between two hosts, the proud son of Cynfarch is he whose it was. | Y gelein veinwen a oloir hediw. a dan brid a mein. gwae vy llaw llad tat owein. | The slender white corpse is being buried today under soil and stones. Alas, my hand, for the killing of Owain's father. |
| Penn a borthaf ar vyn tu. penn uryen llary llywei llu. ac ar y vronn wenn vran du. | I carry a head on my side, the head of generous Urien – he used to lead a host. And on his white breast is a black raven. | Y gelein ueinwen a oloir hediw. ymplith prid a derw. gwae vy llaw llad vyg keuynderw. | The slender white corpse is being buried today in soil and an oak coffin. Alas, my hand, for the killing of my cousin. |
| Penn a borthaf mywn vyg crys. penn vryen llary llywyei llys. ac ar y vronn wen vrein ae hys. | I carry a head on my belt, the head of generous Urien – he used to rule a court. And ravens on his white breast consume him. | Y gelein ueinwenn a oloir [hediw] a dan vein a edewit. gwae vy llaw llam rym tynghit. | The slender white corpse is being buried today – under stones it has been left. Alas, my hand, for the fate which was fated for me. |
| Penn a borthaf ym nedeir. yr yrechwyd oed uugeil. teyrnvron treulyat gennweir. | I carry a head in my hand. He was shepherd over Erechwydd, lord and soldier, a spender of spears. | Y gelein veinwen a oloir [hediw] ymplith prid a thywarch gwae vy llaw llad mab kynuarch. | The slender white corpse is being buried today amidst soil and sods. Alas, my hand, for the killing of the son of Cynfarch. |
| Penn a borthaf tu mordwyt. oed ysgwyt ar wlat. oed olwyn yg kat. oed cledyr cat kywlat rwyt. | I carry a head on the side of my thigh. He was a shield over the country, a wheel in battle, he was a prop in war, a snare of the enemy. | Y gelein ueinwenn a oloir hediw. dan weryt ac arwyd. gwae vy llaw llad vy arglwyd. | The slender white corpse is being buried today under earth and a standard. Alas, my hand, for the killing of my lord. |
| Penn a borthaf ar vyg kled. gwell y vyw nogyt y ued. oed dinas y henwred. | I carry a head on my right side – better he alive than in his grave. He was a fortress for the aged. | Y gelein ueinwen aoloir hediw a dan brid athywawt gwae vy llaw llam rym daerawt. | The slender white corpse is being buried today under soil and sand. Alas, my hand, for the fate which has befallen me. |
| Penn a borthaf o godir. penawc pellynnyawc y luyd [penn] vryen geiryawe glotryd. | I carry a head from the region of Pennawg – his hosts were far-travelling – the head of eloquent and celebrated Urien. | Y gelein veinwenn a oloir hediw. a dan brid a dynat. gwae vy llaw llam rym gallat. | The slender white corpse is being buried today under soil and nettles. Alas, my hand, for the fate which has been brought about for me. |
| Penn a borthaf ar vy ysgwyd. nym aruollei waratwyd. gwae vy llaw llad vy arglwyd. | I carry a head on my shoulder – shame did not use to receive me – alas, my hand, (for) the striking of my lord. | Y gelein veinwen aoloir hediw a dan brid a mein glas. gwae vy llaw llam rym gallas. | The slender white corpse is being buried today under soil and grey stones. Alas, my hand – it caused my fate. |
| Penn a borthaf ar vym breich. neus goruc o dir bryneich. gwedy gawr gelorawr veich. | I carry a head on my arm. He made of the Bernicians after battle a burden for biers. | | |
| Pen a borthaf o dv Paul pen vrien udd dragonawl a chyddel dydd brawd ni'm tawr | I carry a head from the side of a post, the head of Urien, a warlike lord, and though Judgment Day were to come I do not care. | | |
| Penn a borthaf yn aghat vy llaw. llary ud llywyei wlat. penn post prydein ry allat. | I carry a head in the grasp of my hand of a generous lord - he used to lead a country. The chief support of Britain has been carried off. | | |
| Penn a borthaf am porthes. neut atwen nat yr vylles. gwae vy law llym digones. | I carry a head which cared for me. I know it is not for my good. Alas, my hand, it performed harshly. | | |
| Penn a borthaf o du riw. [ar] y eneu ewynvriw. gwaet gwae reget o hediw. | I carry a head from the side of the hill and on his lips is a fine foam of blood. Woe to Rheged because of this day. | | |
| [Ry] thyrvis vym breich ry gardwys vy eis. vyg callon neur dorres penn a borthaf am porthes. | It has wrenched my arm, it has crushed my ribs, it has broken my heart. I carry a head which cared for me. | | |

=== Urien in other medieval Welsh literature ===
Urien is mentioned in passing in the Llywarch Hen cycle, poems about the sufferings of his cousin Llywarch and written with the poet speaking from Llywarch's point of view. They are, like Canu Urien, certainly later than Llywarch and Urien's time. Urien is recorded as supplying Llywarch's last surviving son Gwên with a horn which Llywarch advises Gwên to blow if he needs aid while on guard at night.

In the mnemonic devices known as the Welsh Triads, intended for poets to recall traditional stories, Urien is mentioned repeatedly. These mostly agree with the testimony of the Historia Brittonum and the other early sources, though there are some references to the later traditions. Urien is one of the "Three Armoured Warriors", "Three battle-rulers", and "Three Holy Womb-burdens". The latter gives his mother as Nefyn ferch Brychan Brycheiniog, and his wife as Modron ferch Afallach. Likewise, his killing at the hands of Llofan Llaw Ddifo is one of the "Three Unfortunate Slaughters". There are chronological impossibilities with associating his wife with a daughter of Brychan, and Modron is a purely legendary figure, whose first association with Urien is in this triad. Nevertheless, these show the enduring interest in Urien in the later Middle Ages, and the invention of tradition to satisfy continued regard for his life and deeds. (Note: Despite what one might find in earlier scholarship, and reams of sources online, there is no good reason to claim that these stories about character such as Modron reflect some kind of older, pagan connection, as the names which appear to be survivals from pre-Christian religion do not necessarily bear any relation to their pagan forebears. Take, for example, the name Llywelyn, which is *Lugu-belinos, two pagan gods smashed together, but a name given to perfectly ordinary and historic men, and devoted Christians, too. See Rodway 2018. For the derivation of Llywelyn, see Jackson 1953, p. 414. In the Middle Ages, it appears that people just associated these names with great antiquity, and so recycled them for use in stories about their legendary past, of which Urien plays a part.)

As well as Taliesin, Urien was supposed to have employed a poet named Tristfardd (literally 'sad poet'), as recorded in another triad, which calls Tristfardd one of the "Three Red-Speared Bards". Three englynion preserved in a very late manuscript record a story recounting how this Tristfardd secretly courted Urien's wife, and, not recognising the king, sent a disguised Urien to send a message to her. Urien slew Tristfardd for this offence at 'Rhyd Tristfardd', supposed to be in Radnorshire. This is a late tradition, and runs contrary to the association of Urien with Taliesin and the very strong association of Urien with the North, though it seems probable that this story was affixed to the name of Trisfardd even later than his appearance in the Triads.

Literature about Urien, whether reflecting early material or not, seems to have circulated in more channels than survive to the present. This can be evidenced by the twelfth-century poet Cynddelw Brydydd Mawr's attribution of the 'wrath of Urien' to his patron Owain Cyfeiliog, using the form Urfoën (Middle Welsh: Uruoen). This reflects an older form of the name (reconstructed as a Common Brittonic form *Urbogen) which retained the composition vowel. This vowel is reflected in a weakened form /ə/ in one rendition of Urien's name in the Historia Brittonum, Urbagen (Old Welsh pronunciation: [ɨ̞rβəˈɣɛn]). Kenneth Jackson dated the loss of this vowel to the sixth century in Welsh, and Ifor Williams went so far as to say the trisyllabic form must be reinserted in one of the Taliesin poems to rectify a defect in the metre in a line in one poem. Assuming Cynddelw did not independently create this form so that he might fill the metre of this line in his own poem, this gives the tantalising suggestion that he was reading sources about Urien which do not survive to us, or that this name survived in a fossilised spoken form as a part of bardic lore.

=== The rebellion of Rhys FitzUryen ap Gruffudd ===
Arms of Rhys ap Thomas (d. 1525), attributed to Urien, with whom Rhys claimed kinship

Like many other figures of the Early Middle Ages in Welsh tradition, Urien captured interest in Wales even a millennium after his death. In the sixteenth century, Rhys ap Gruffudd, a grandson of the Rhys ap Thomas who greatly aided Henry Tudor at the Battle of Bosworth Field, was disinherited from his grandfather's estates by order of Henry VIII. The king instead gave these lands to his follower Walter Devereux. This greatly incensed Rhys, who then began a long feud with Devereux, which ultimately led to the execution of Rhys on charges of treason. Just like Henry Tudor, Rhys tried to weaponise political prophecy to gather support for his cause in Wales. He was accused of going by the name "FitzUryen", meaning 'son of Urien', and attempting to gain support from James V of Scotland to make himself an independent Prince of Wales. Rhys claimed to be a member of the house of Dinefwr, which originated with Rhodri Mawr's son Cadell. Rhodri's ancestry claims an origin from Llywarch Hen, which would make Rhys ap Gruffudd a distant relative of Urien. (Note: It appears that Rhys claimed direct descent from Urien, perhaps a confusion on the part of later tradition. Note that other, similarly late medieval families claimed descent from Urien's sons, see Bartrum 1974, pp. 11, 51, etc.) As Urien was remembered for his battles against the English, the authorities feared he would be able to capitalise on anti-English sentiment in Wales. Urien's son Owain was associated with ravens in later Welsh literature, and Rhys ap Gruffudd, together with his grandfather Rhys ap Thomas, bore three ravens on their coat of arms, which were called the "ravens of Urien" by contemporaneous poets such as Guto'r Glyn and Lewys Glyn Cothi.

== Arthurian legend ==
Geoffrey of Monmouth, drawing on Welsh sources and his own imagination, adapted Urien into the Arthurian legend, and made him known across Europe with the explosive popularity of his Historia Regum Britanniae. In Geoffrey's telling, taken on by many following him, Urien is one of three brothers who ruled Scotland before the Saxon invasion – the others being Lot of Lothian, and Augusel. After freeing Scotland, Arthur restored the throne of Alba to Augusel, and made Urien king of Mureif (perhaps Monreith, or Moray). Urien's son Eventus later succeeds Augusel as king of Alba.

=== Romances ===
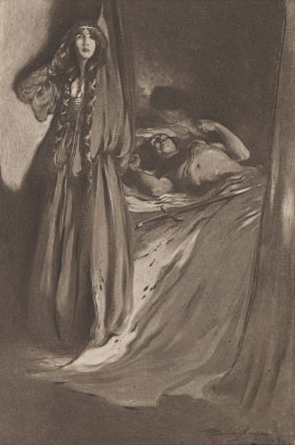
Urien slain by his own wife Morgane (succeeding here unlike in medieval tellings) in Eric Pape's illustration for Madison Cawein's 1889 poem "Accolon of Gaul"

In the 13th-century Arthurian chivalric romances, the location of his kingdom is transferred to either Garloth (Garlot) or the otherworldly and magical Kingdom of Gorre (Gore). During the reign of Uther Pendragon, Arthur's father, Urien (or Uriens) marries a sister or half-sister of the young Arthur. She is either Morgan or one of the others, such as Hermesan in the Livre d'Artus and Blasine in Of Arthour and of Merlin. Urien, like the kings of several other lands, initially opposes Arthur's accession to the throne after Uther's death. He and the others rebel against the young monarch (with Urien even briefly kidnapping Arthur's wife Guinevere in the Livre d'Artus). Upon their defeat, he is among the rebel leaders who become Arthur's allies and vassals. His marriage to Morgan is not portrayed as a happy one, as in a popular version from the Post-Vulgate Cycle (later included in Thomas Malory's influential Le Morte d'Arthur) Morgan plots to use Excalibur to kill both Urien and Arthur and place herself and her lover Accolon on the throne. Morgan fails in both parts of that plan, foiled by their own son and by the Lady of the Lake, respectively.

Urien is usually said to be the father of Ywain (Owain) by Morgan, but many texts also give him a second son, Ywain the Bastard, fathered on his seneschal's wife. Welsh tradition further attributes to him a daughter named Morfudd by Modron.

According to Roger Sherman Loomis, the name and character of another Arthurian king, Nentres of Garlot (in Malory, the husband of Arthur's sister Elaine), could have been derived from that of Urien. Malory spells Urien's name as Urience of Gorre, which has led some later authors (e.g. Alfred Tennyson) to identify him with Arthur's relentless rival King Rience.

In the Didot-Perceval manuscript of the Perceval en prose (c. 1200), Perceval fights Urbain, son of the Queen of the Black Thorn (Reine de la Noire Espine) and defender of a ford and an invisible castle. Following Urbain's defeat, a flock of monstrous ravens attacks Perceval, who manages to wound one of them which immediately transforms into a beautiful young girl, soon carried off by the other birds to Avalon. Urbain explains that she is the sister of his fairy mistress and her attendants. According to Loomis, the story's Urbain corresponds to Urien, father of Owain (Yvain) and husband of Morgen (Morgan), the latter being the equivalent of the Welsh Modron and the Irish Morrígan ('Great Queen'). Modern scholarship in the field of Celtic studies strongly disapproves of this and other mythologising and equation of Welsh and Irish material haphazardly.

== Bibliography ==
=== Primary sources for the 'historic' Urien ===
- Bartrum, Peter, ed. (1974). Welsh genealogies AD 300–1400. Cardiff: University of Wales Press. ISBN 9780708305614.
- Dumville, David, ed. (2002). Annales Cambriae, A.D. 682-954: Texts A–C in Parallel. Cambridge: Department of Anglo-Saxon, Norse and Celtic, University of Cambridge. ISBN 9780954318628.
- Gruffydd, R. Geraint (1978). "Canu Cadwallon ap Cadfan". In Bromwich, Rachel; Jones, R. Brinley (eds.). Astudiaethau ar yr Hengerdd: Studies in Old Welsh Poetry (in Welsh). Cardiff: University of Wales Press. ISBN 9780708306963.
- Gwenogvryn Evans, John, ed. (1910). Facsimile and Text of the Book of Taliesin. Llanbedrog: John Gwenogvryn Evans. IA facsimiletextofb00evan.
- Guy, Ben, ed. (2020a). Medieval Welsh Genealogy: an Introduction and Textual Study. Woodbridge: Boydell Press. ISBN 9781783275137.
- Jackson, Kenneth, ed. (1969). The Gododdin: the Oldest Scottish Poem. Edinburgh: Edinburgh University Press. ISBN 9780852240496.
- Morris, John, ed. (1980). Nennius: British History and The Welsh Annals. London: Phillimore. ISBN 9780847662647.
- Rowland, Jenny, ed. (1990). Early Welsh Saga Poetry: A Study and Edition of the Englynion. Cambridge: D. S. Brewer. ISBN 9780859912754.
- Koch, John T., ed. (1997). The Gododdin of Aneirin: Text and Context from Dark-Age North Britain (PDF). Cardiff: University of Wales Press. ISBN 9780708313749. Archived from the original on 4 April 2025.
- ——, ed. (2013). Cunedda, Cynan, Cadwallon, Cynddylan: Four Welsh Poems and Britain 383-655. Aberystwyth: Centre for Advanced Welsh and Celtic Studies. ISBN 9781907029134.
- Williams, Ifor, ed. (1935). Canu Llywarch Hen (in Welsh). Cardiff: University of Wales Press.
- ——, ed. (1938). Canu Aneirin (in Welsh). Cardiff: University of Wales Press.
- ——, ed. (1968). The Poems of Taliesin. Translated by Williams, J. E. Caerwyn. Dublin: Institute for Advanced Studies. ISBN 9780901282019.
- Williams, Rowan; Lewis, Gwyneth, eds. (2019). The Book of Taliesin: Poems of Warfare and Praise in an Enchanted Britain. London: Penguin Classics. ISBN 9780241381137.

=== Primary sources for the Urien legend ===
- Bramley, Kathleen Anne; Owen, Morfydd E., eds. (1994). Gwaith Llewelyn Fardd I ac eraill o feirdd y ddeuddegfed ganrif (in Welsh). Cardiff: University of Wales Press. ISBN 9780708312148.
- Bromwich, Rachel, ed. (2014). Trioedd Ynys Prydein: The Triads of the Island of Britain (4th ed.). Cardiff: University of Wales Press. ISBN 9781783161454.
- Haycock, Marged, ed. (2007). Legendary Poems from the Book of Taliesin. Aberystwyth: CMCS Publications. ISBN 9780955718281.
- ——, ed. (2013a). Prophecies from the Book of Taliesin. Aberystwyth: CMCS Publications. ISBN 9780955718274.
- Johnston, Dafydd, ed. (1995). Gwaith Lewys Glyn Cothi (in Welsh). Cardiff: University of Wales Press. ISBN 9780708312537.
- ——, ed. (2013). "Moliant i Syr Rhys ap Tomas o Abermarlais". Guto'r Glyn.net. Aberystwyth: Centre for Advanced Welsh and Celtic Studies. Archived from the original on 19 June 2015.
- Jones, Nerys Ann; Parry Owen, Ann, eds. (1991). Gwaith Cynddelw Brydydd Mawr (in Welsh). Vol. 1. Cardiff: University of Wales Press. ISBN 9780708310861.
- Tennyson, Alfred (1983). Idylls of the King. London: Penguin. ISBN 9780140422535. IA idyllsofking0000tenn_j2c9.

=== Secondary historical scholarship ===
- Charles-Edwards, Thomas (2013). Wales and the Britons, 350-1064. Oxford: Oxford University Press. ISBN 9780198217312. IA walesbritons35010000char.
- Dumville, David (1990). "'Nennius' and the Historia Brittonum". Histories and pseudo-histories of the insular Middle Ages. Aldershot: Variorum. pp. 78–95. ISBN 9780860782643.
- Flood, Victoria (2016). "Political Prophecy and the Trial of Rhys ap Gruffydd, 1530–31". Studia Celtica. 50. University of Wales Press: 133–150. doi:10.16922/SC.50.8.
- Guy, Ben (2015). "The Origins of the Compilation of Welsh Historical Texts in Harley 3859". Studia Celtica. 49. University of Wales Press: 21–56.
- —— (2020b). "Geoffrey of Monmouth's Welsh Sources". In Henley, Georgia; Byron Smith, Joshua (eds.). A Companion to Geoffrey of Monmouth. Leiden/Boston: Brill. ISBN 978-90-04-41039-8.
- Jackson, Kenneth (1963). "On the Northern British Section in Nennius". In Chadwick, Nora K. (ed.). Celt and Saxon: studies in the early British border. Cambridge: Cambridge University Press. ISBN 9780521046022. OCLC 399312.
- Jones, Owain Wyn (2020). "The Most Excellent Princes: Geoffrey of Monmouth and Medieval Welsh Historical Writing". In Henley, Georgia; Byron Smith, Joshua (eds.). A Companion to Geoffrey of Monmouth. Leiden/Boston: Brill. ISBN 978-90-04-41039-8.
- Koch, John T., ed. (2006). Celtic Culture: A Historical Encyclopedia. Santa Barbara: ABC-CLIO. ISBN 9781851094400.
- Lovecy, Ian (1976). "The end of Celtic Britain: a sixth-century battle near Lindisfarne". Archaeologia Aeliana. 5 (4). Society of Antiquaries of Newcastle: 31–45. doi:10.5284/1060643.
- Parker, Will (2022). "The Coeling: Narrative and Identity in North Britain and Wales AD 580–950". Northern History. 59. Taylor & Francis: 2–27. doi:10.1080/0078172X.2022.2031049.
- Sims-Williams, Patrick (1996). "The Death of Urien". Cambrian Medieval Celtic Studies. 32. CMCS Publications: 25–56.
- —— (2003). The Celtic Inscriptions of Britain: Phonology and Chronology, c. 400-1200. Oxford: Philological Society. ISBN 9781405109031.
- Thornton, David E. (2004). "Urien Rheged [Urien ap Cynfarch] (fl. c. 560–c. 580), king of Rheged". Oxford Dictionary of National Biography (online ed.). Oxford University Press. doi:10.1093/ref:odnb/28016. (Subscription, Wikipedia Library access or UK public library membership required.)

=== Secondary literary scholarship ===
- Andrews, Celeste L. (2019). "What Did Cynddelw Know About the Old North?". Proceedings of the Harvard Celtic Colloquium. 39. Harvard University Press: 39–52. JSTOR 45373693.
- Bromwich, Rachel (1978). "Cynon fab Clydno". In Bromwich, Rachel; Jones, R. Brinley (eds.). Astudiaethau ar yr Hengerdd: Studies in Old Welsh Poetry (in Welsh). Cardiff: University of Wales Press. ISBN 9780708306963.
- Bruce, Christopher W. (1999). The Arthurian Name Dictionary. New York: Garland. ISBN 9780815328650. IA arthuriannamedic0000bruc.
- Haycock, Marged (2013b). "Early Welsh Poets Look North". In Woolf, Alex (ed.). Beyond the Gododdin: Dark Age Scotland in Medieval Wales. St Andrews: Committee for Dark Ages Studies. pp. 9–40. ISBN 9780955718274.
- —— (2020). "The Old North in Medieval Wales". In Plumb, Oisín; Sanmark, Alexandra; Heddle, Donna (eds.). What is North? Imagining and Representing the North from Ancient Times to the Present Day. Turnhout: Brepols. pp. 53–70. ISBN 9782503585024.
- Irslinger, Britta (2017). "Medb 'the intoxicating one'? (Re-)constructing the past through etymology". Ulidia. 4. Four Courts Press: 38–94.
- Isaac, Graham R. (1993). "'Canu Aneirin Awdl LI'". Journal of Celtic Linguistics. 2. University of Wales Press: 65–91.
- —— (1998). "Gweith Gwen Ystrat and the Northern Heroic Age of the Sixth Century". Cambrian Medieval Celtic Studies. 36. CMCS Publications: 61–70.
- —— (1999). "Readings in History and Transmission of the Gododdin". Cambrian Medieval Celtic Studies. 37. CMCS Publications: 55–78.
- Jackson, Kenneth (1953). Language and History in Early Britain. Edinburgh: Edinburgh University Press. ISBN 9780852241165. IA languagehistoryi0000jack.
- Koch, John T. (1986). "When was Welsh literature first written down?". Studia Celtica. 20/21. University of Wales Press: 43–66.
- —— (2005). "Why Was Welsh Literature First Written Down?". In Fulton, Helen (ed.). Medieval Celtic Literature and Society. Dublin: Four Courts Press. pp. 15–31. ISBN 1851829288.
- Loomis, Roger Sherman (1930). "Some Names in Arthurian Romance". Proceedings of the Modern Language Association. 45 (2). Cambridge University Press: 416–443. doi:10.2307/457801. JSTOR 457801.
- Loomis, Roger Sherman (1943). "More Celtic Elements in Gawain and the Green Knight". The Journal of English and Germanic Philology. 42 (2). University of Illinois Press: 149–184. JSTOR 27704974.
- —— (1945). "The Combat at the Ford in the Didot Perceval". Modern Philology. 43 (1). University of Chicago Press: 63–71. doi:10.1086/388668. JSTOR 434394.
- Morris-Jones, John (1918). "Taliesin". Y Cymmrodor. 28. The Honourable Society of Cymmrodorion: 1–290. IA ycymmrodor28cymmuoft.
- Padel, Oliver (1998). "A new study of the Gododdin". Cambrian Medieval Celtic Studies. 35. CMCS Publications: 45–56.
- —— (2013). "Aneirin and Taliesin: sceptical speculations". In Woolf, Alex (ed.). Beyond the Gododdin: Dark Age Scotland in Medieval Wales. St Andrews: Committee for Dark Ages Studies. pp. 115–152. ISBN 9780955718274.
- Rodway, Simon (2013). Dating Medieval Welsh Literature: Evidence from the Verbal System. Aberystwyth: CMCS Publications. ISBN 9780955718250.
- —— (2018). "The Mabinogi and the shadow of Celtic mythology" (PDF). Studia Celtica. LII. University of Wales Press: 67–85. doi:10.16922/SC.52.4. hdl:2160/651b0fe7-9527-4fa4-b86a-86b6434a0675. Archived from the original (PDF) on 8 December 2024.
- Russell, Paul (2020). "Three notes on Canu Urien". North American Journal of Celtic Studies. 4 (1). Ohio State University Press: 48–78. doi:10.1353/cel.2020.a781249.
- Sims-Williams, Patrick (1984). "Gildas and vernacular poetry". In Dumville, David N.; Lapidge, Michael (eds.). Gildas: New Approaches. Cambridge: Boydell Press. pp. 169–192. ISBN 9780851154039.
- —— (2016). "Dating the poems of Aneirin and Taliesin". Zeitschrift für celtische Philologie. 63. De Gruyter: 163–234. doi:10.1515/zcph-2016-0008.
- Wood, Juliet (1983). "Virgil and Taliesin: the concept of the magician in medieval folklore". Folklore. 94 (1). Taylor & Francis: 91–104. doi:10.1080/0015587X.1983.9716260. JSTOR 1260172.
