= Hywel Foel ap Griffri ap Pwyll Wyddel =

Welsh poet

Hywel Foel ap Griffri ap Pwyll Wyddel (fl. c. 1240 – c. 1300) was a Welsh language court poet.

Hywel Foel's only surviving work is an awdl which laments the capture and imprisonment of Owain ap Gruffudd at Dolbadarn Castle. The text of this awdl is preserved in the Hendregadredd manuscript and is noted for being one of the earliest direct references to Snowdonia (Welsh: Eryri) in Welsh poetry.

== Bibliography ==
- Rhian M. Andrews et al. (ed.), Gwaith Bleddyn Fardd a beirdd eraill ail hanner y drydedd ganrif ar ddeg (Aberystwyth, 1996)
