= Bonedd y Saint =

Welsh genealogical tract

The Bonedd y Saint or Seint (Welsh for "Descent of the Saints") is a Welsh genealogical tract detailing the lineages of the early British saints. There are a number of different manuscripts in existence dating from the early 13th to the late 17th century, although the material is much older in origin.

The book has also been known as Achau Saint Ynys Prydain ("Genealogy of the Saints" or "Pedigrees of the Saints of the Isle of Britain").
