= Morfudd ferch Urien =

Legendary daughter of Urien Rheged

Morfudd ferch Urien is a figure of Welsh Arthurian legend. She is the daughter of Urien Rheged by Modron, and twin sister to Owain. Morfudd appears in the Welsh Triads and is also referred to in Culhwch and Olwen. The enduring love between her and Cynon son of Clydno, one of Arthur's warriors, is remarked on in several of the Triads, pointing to a now-lost popular tradition.

The circumstances of her birth are related in a Welsh folktale:

In Denbighshire there is a parish which is called Llanferes, and there is there Rhyd y Gyfarthfa (the Ford of Barking). In the old days the hounds of the countryside used to come together to the side of that the ford to bark, and nobody dared go to find out what was there until Urien Rheged came. And when he came to the side of the ford he saw nothing except a woman washing. And then the hounds ceased barking, and Urien seized the woman and he had his will of her; and then she said "God's blessing on the feet which brought thee here." "Why?" said he. "Because I have been fated to wash here until I should conceive a son by a Christian. And I am daughter to the King of Annwfn, and come thou here at the end of the year and then thou shalt receive that boy." And so he came and he received there a boy and a girl: that is, Owain son of Urien and Morvydd daughter of Urien.
