= Rheged =

Sub-Roman kingdom of Northern Britain

Kingdom of Rheged
- c.500–c. 600
- Yr Hen Ogledd (The Old North) c.500
- Capital: Carlisle
- Common languages: Cumbric
- Religion: Celtic Christianity
- Government: Monarchy
- Meirchion Gul
- Cynfarch Oer
- Urien
- Owain mab Urien
Preceded by	Succeeded by
Hen Ogledd	Kingdom of Northumbria; Kingdom of Strathclyde
- Today part of: United Kingdom

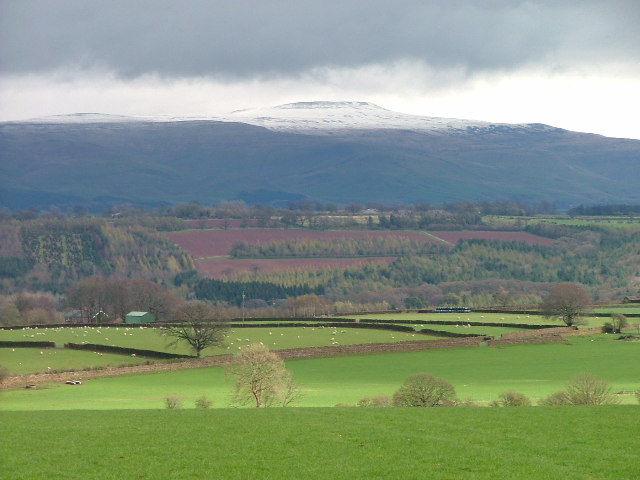
The Eden Valley is thought by some to have been the heartland of the kingdom of Rheged.

Rheged (Welsh pronunciation: [ˈr̥ɛɡɛd]) was one of the kingdoms of the Hen Ogledd ('Old North'), the Brittonic-speaking region of what is now Northern England and southern Scotland, during the post-Roman era and Early Middle Ages. It is recorded in several poetic and bardic sources, although its borders are not described in any of them. Archaeological work from 2012 onwards on a site in Galloway in Scotland is interpreted by the excavators as showing that it is a royal centre of Rheged. Rheged possibly extended into Lancashire and other parts of northern England. In some sources, Rheged is intimately associated with the king Urien Rheged and his family. Its inhabitants spoke Cumbric, a Brittonic dialect closely related to Old Welsh.

== Etymology ==
The origin of the name Rheged has been described as "problematic". One Brittonic-language solution is that the name may be a compound of *rö-, a prefix meaning "great", and *cę:d meaning "wood, forest" (cf. Welsh coed) although the expected form in Welsh would be **Rhygoed. If association of the name with *cę:d is correct, the prefix may be rag-, meaning "before, adjacent to, opposite". Derivation from the element reg, which with the suffix -ed has connotations of "generosity", is another possibility.

== Location ==
The name Rheged appears regularly as an epithet of Urien (a late 6th-century king of Rheged) in a number of early Welsh poems and royal genealogies. His victories over the Anglian chieftains of Bernicia in the second half of the 6th century are recorded by Nennius and celebrated by the bard Taliesin, who calls him "Ruler of Rheged". He is thus placed squarely in the North of Britain and perhaps specifically in Westmorland when referred to as "Ruler of Llwyfenydd" (identified with the Lyvennet Valley). Later legend associates Urien with the city of Carlisle (the Roman Luguvalium), only twenty-five miles away; Higham suggests that Rheged was "broadly conterminous with the earlier Civitas Carvetiorum, the Roman administrative unit based on Carlisle". Although it is possible that Rheged was merely a stronghold, it was not uncommon for sub-Roman monarchs to use their kingdom's name as an epithet.

Place-name evidence, e.g., Dunragit (possibly "Fort of Rheged")^{α} suggests that, at least in one period of its history, Rheged included Dumfries and Galloway. Recent archaeological excavations at Trusty's Hill, a vitrified fort near Gatehouse of Fleet, and the analysis of its artefacts in the context of other sites and their artefacts have led to claims that the kingdom was centred on Galloway early in the 7th century.

Interpretations of another place-name, with even less certainty, indicate that Rheged could also have reached as far south as Rochdale in Greater Manchester, recorded in the Domesday Book as Recedham. The River Roch on which Rochdale stands was recorded in the 13th century as Rached or Rachet. Such names may derive from Old English reced "hall or house". However, no other place names originating from this Old English element exist, which makes this derivation unlikely. If they are not of English origin, these place-names may incorporate the element 'Rheged' precisely because they lay on or near its borders. Certainly Urien's kingdom stretched eastward at one time, as he was also "Ruler of Catraeth" (Catterick in North Yorkshire).

It is accepted by most scholars, therefore, that Rheged was a kingdom covering a large part of modern Cumbria as well as areas of Dumfries and Galloway and extended, for some of its history, into present day Yorkshire.

== Kings of Rheged ==
The traditional royal genealogy of Urien and his successors traces their ancestry back to Coel Hen (considered by some to be the origins of the Old King Cole of folk tradition), who is considered by many to be a mythical figure; if he has some historicity, he may have ruled a considerable part of the North in the early 5th century. All of those listed below may have ruled in Rheged, but only three of their number can be verified from external sources:

- Meirchion Gul, father of Cynfarch
- Cynfarch Oer (Cynfarch the Dismal), also known as Cynfarch fab Meirchion and Cynfarch Gul, father of Urien
- Urien Rheged, (c. 550 – 590), about whom survive eight songs of Taliesin
- Owain, also celebrated for having fought the Bernicians; son of Urien

There are two possible later kings of Rheged:

- Rhun, said to have been a son of Urien. He is recorded in Welsh sources as having baptised Edwin of Northumbria, however, he may merely have stood sponsor at the baptism, thus becoming Edwin's godfather.
- Royth (perhaps Rhaith - meaning 'Law, rule, right, verdict or justice' in Welsh), son of Rhun, and possibly the last king of Rheged.

== Southern Rheged ==
A second royal genealogy exists for a line, perhaps of kings, descended from Cynfarch Oer's brother: Elidir Lydanwyn. According to Bonedd Gwŷr y Gogledd Elidir's son, Llywarch Hen, was a ruler in North Britain in the 6th century. He was driven from his territory by princely in-fighting after Urien's death and was perhaps in old age associated with Powys. However, it is possible, because of internal inconsistencies, that the poetry connected to Powys was associated with Llywarch's name at a later, probably 9th century, date. Llywarch is referred to in some poems as king of South Rheged, and in others as king of Argoed, suggesting that the two regions were the same. Searching for Llywarch's kingdom has led some historians to propose that Rheged may have been divided between sons, resulting in northern and southern successor states. The connections of the family of Llywarch and Urien with Powys has suggested to some, on grounds of proximity, that the area of modern Lancashire may have been their original home.

== End of Rheged ==
After Bernicia united with Deira to become the kingdom of Northumbria, Rheged was annexed by Northumbria, some time before AD 730. There was a royal marriage between Prince (later King) Oswiu of Northumbria and the Rhegedian princess Rieinmelth, granddaughter of Rum (Rhun), probably in 638, so it is possible that it was a peaceful takeover, both kingdoms being inherited by the same man.

After Rheged was incorporated into Northumbria, the old Cumbric language was gradually replaced by Old English, Cumbric surviving only in remote upland communities. Around the year 900, after the power of Northumbria was destroyed by Viking incursions and settlement, large areas west of the Pennines fell without apparent warfare under the control of the Brittonic Kingdom of Strathclyde, with Leeds recorded as being on the border between the Britons and the Norse Kingdom of York. This may have represented the political assertion of lingering Brittonic culture in the region. The area of Cumbria remained under the control of Strathclyde until the early 11th century when Strathclyde itself was absorbed into the Scottish kingdom. The name of the people, whose modern Welsh form is Cymry has, however, survived in the name of Cumberland and now Cumbria; it probably derives from an old Celtic word *Kombroges meaning "fellow countrymen".

== Discovery of a possible royal centre of Rheged ==
In 2012 archaeologists found evidence at Trusty's Hill near the town of Gatehouse of Fleet, in Galloway, southwest Scotland, which they interpreted as suggesting that the site may have been a royal centre of Rheged's capital c. 600 AD. One of the lead researchers, Ronan Toolis, stated that their findings revealed structural ruins atop the hill. These originally belonged to a fortification system with a timber-reinforced stone rampart where the main fortification was supplemented by smaller defensive works along the low-lying slopes. According to Toolis, this suggests the presence of a royal stronghold of the period. The historian Roger Collins is sceptical, arguing that the evidence does not fit [the excavators'] favoured interpretation of the site as a royal centre".

== Genetic legacy ==
According to the University of Oxford's People of the British Isles project, the original population of Rheged has left a distinct genetic heritage amongst the people of Cumbria. The research compared the DNA of over 2000 people across the British Isles whose grandparents were all born within 50 miles (80 km) of each other, and found a number of cases, including Rheged, where genetic clusters of people matched the location of historical kingdoms (other examples included Bernicia and Elmet).

== Notes ==
^αbut see: Clarkson, T. J., The Men of the North: The Britons of Southern Scotland, John Donald, 2010, p. 71: "Archaeologists are extremely sceptical that this was a site occupied in Early Historic times, still less that it was a royal residence. Such scepticism raises serious doubts about the usual derivation of the place-name Dunragit which may in fact be a red herring. It has been suggested that the second element could be Gaelic reichet rather than Old Welsh Reget, and that the place was so named by the Gall Gaidhil, 'foreign Gaels', who colonised Galloway in the Viking period." For Gaelic re(i)chet, cf. the Old Irish place name Mag Roichet/Rechet (Modern Irish Maigh Reichead), now Morett, country Laois, Ireland.

== Sources and further reading ==
- Chadwick, H.M. (1959). Cambridge Studies in Early British History. Cambridge: Cambridge University Press.
- Chadwick, H.M.; Chadwick, N.K. (1940). The Growth of Literature. Vol. 1. Cambridge: Cambridge University Press.
- Chadwick, N.K (1973) [1958]. Studies in the Early British Church. North Haven, CT: Archon Books. ISBN 978-0-208-01315-6.
- Jackson, Kenneth (1953). Language & History in Early Britain. Edinburgh: Edinburgh University Press.
- Kapelle, W.E. (1979). The Norman Conquest of the North: the Region and its Transformation, 1000–1135. Chapel Hill, NC: University of North Carolina Press. ISBN 978-0-7099-0040-5.
- Koch, John T, ed. (2006). Celtic culture: a historical encyclopedia. Santa Barbara, CA: ABC-CLIO. ISBN 978-1-85109-440-0.
- McCarthy, Mike (March 2011). "The kingdom of Rheged : a landscape perspective". Northern History. 48 (1). Leeds: 9–22. doi:10.1179/174587011X12928631621159. S2CID 159794496.
- Toolis, R; Bowles, C (2016). The Lost Dark Age Kingdom of Rheged: The Discovery of a Royal Stronghold at Trusty's Hill, Galloway. Oxbow Books Limited. ISBN 9781785703119.
- Williams, Ifor (1960). Canu Taliesin Gyda Rhagymadrodd A Nodiadau. Cardiff: University of Wales Press.
- Williams, Ifor, ed. (1972). The Beginnings of Welsh Poetry (3rd [paperback, 1990] ed.). Cardiff: University of Wales Press. ISBN 978-0-7083-0035-0.
