= Harleian genealogies =

Manuscript collection of Old Welsh genealogies

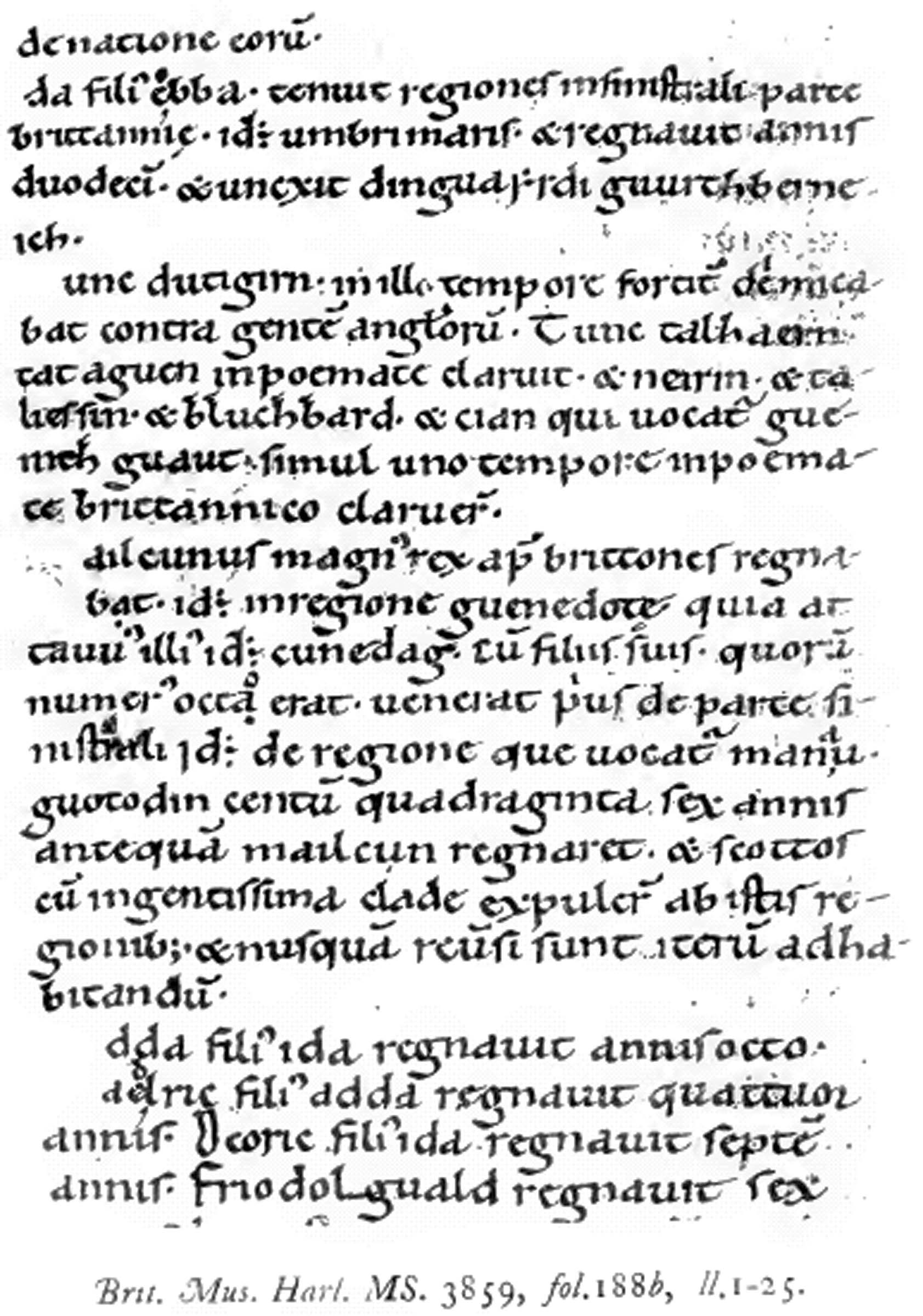
- Author(s): anonymous
- Language: Latin
- Date: 10th century
- Manuscript(s): British Library, Harley MS 3859 (c. 1100-1200)
- Genre: genealogical collection

The Harleian genealogies are a collection of Old Welsh genealogies preserved in British Library, Harley MS 3859. Part of the Harleian Library, the manuscript, which also contains the Annales Cambriae (Recension A) and a version of the Historia Brittonum, has been dated to c. 1100, although a date of c.1200 is also possible.

Since the genealogies begin with the paternal and maternal pedigrees of Owain ap Hywel Dda (d. 988), the material was probably compiled during his reign. The collection also traces the lineages of less prominent rulers of Wales and the Hen Ogledd. Some of the genealogies reappear in the genealogies from Jesus College MS 20. The collection features the oldest genealogies of Welsh royal families, and include the dynasty of Cunedda (Cunedag), all the way to Beli Mawr, as head of the house of Gwynedd.

Despite their sometimes contradictory pedigrees and recognizable distortions, they contain genuine historical material of a sometimes surprising variety. One of the genealogies preserved the names of the Iron Age rulers Caratacus, Cunobelinus, and "Teuhant", contemporaries of Augustus. The latter's name, Teuhant, was unknown elsewhere until coins minted with his original Brythonic name, Tasciovanus, were discovered in the 19th century, connecting his existence with the genealogies.

== See also ==
- Genealogies from Jesus College MS 20
- Bonedd Gwŷr y Gogledd
- Book of Baglan
- Frankish Table of Nations
