= Gweith Gwen Ystrat =

Welsh heroic poem

- "The Battle of Gwen Ystrad"
- Author(s): unknown
- Ascribed to: Taliesin
- Language: late Old Welsh or Middle Welsh
- Date: late 6th century; possibly between 1050 and 1150 (Isaac 1998)
- Manuscript(s): Book of Taliesin (NLW MS Peniarth 2)
- Genre: heroic poem
- Verse form: lines in end-rhyme, (usually) of 9 syllables each
- Length: 32 lines
- Setting: Battle at Llech Wen, Gwen Ystrad (unidentified)
- Period covered: late 6th century
- Personages: Urien, prince of Rheged; men of Catraeth; men of Britain or Pictland

Gweith Gwen Ystrat (in English: The Battle of Gwen Ystrad) is a late Old Welsh or Middle Welsh heroic poem found uniquely in the Book of Taliesin, where it forms part of the Canu Taliesin, a series of poems attributed to the 6th-century court poet of Rheged, Taliesin.

== Content ==
Put in the mouth of a first-person eyewitness, the poem glorifies a victory by Urien, prince of Rheged, in which he led his warband in defence against a host of invaders at a site called Llech Gwen in Gwen Ystrad (Gwen valley). The heavy, prolonged fighting is said to have taken place since dawn at the entrance to a ford. Sir Ifor Williams suggests that the personal name Gwên may lie behind the forms Llech Gwen and possibly Gwen Ystrad, but the site cannot be identified.

Urien's champions are described as the "men of Catraeth" (line 1), a place often equated with Catterick (North Yorkshire), and the enemy forces as the "men of Britain" (gwyr Prydein, line 6), who have come in large numbers to attack the land. Sir John Morris-Jones and John T. Koch prefer to emend Prydein to Prydyn "land of the Picts". Ifor Williams offers some support for their identification as Picts, pointing out that the adversaries are envisaged as horsemen, to judge by the allusion to rawn eu kaffon "manes of their horses" (line 22). This description would fit the Picts but rules out the Saxons, who fought on foot. However, the emendation is not universally accepted.

In the commentary to his edition of the poem Y Gododdin, Koch argues that the Gwen Ystrad poem offers a vital clue for an understanding of the 6th-century Battle of Catraeth portrayed in Y Gododdin, in which the Gododdin are said to have suffered a catastrophic defeat. Koch breaks with the long-held view that the disaster at Catraeth was a battle against the Angles of Deira and Bernicia and points to the participation of warriors from Rheged. He equates the two battles of the poems, suggesting that they both refer to a conflict between the dynasty of Urien, i.e. the Coeling or descendants of Coel Hen, and the Gododdin, who in Gweith Gwen Ystrat, as in Y Gododdin, are shown assisted by the Pictish troops (see above) but are not otherwise named. The Gwen Ystrad poem would then present a victor's view of the same event.

However, Koch's interpretation of the poem has been challenged on a number of counts. He relies on an early date for Gweith Gwen Ystrat, classifying its language as what he calls 'Archaic Neo-Brittonic', a form of Old Welsh spoken in the 6th century, which he regards as the language in which Y Gododdin was originally composed. However, on re-editing the poem, Graham Isaac argues against Koch's methods and conclusions and suggests instead that Gweith Gwen Ystrat may have been composed in the 11th century or later. Moreover, the Gododdin are not mentioned in the poem and the presumed presence of Picts hinges on an unnecessary emendation for a word which makes sense on its own right. Responding to Koch's perception of the 6th-century heroic age as a possible but distant milieu for the production of literature, Isaac says that a "'heroic age' cannot produce literature, because a 'heroic age' is itself produced through literature".

== Translation ==
Catraeth's men set out at daybreak
Round a battle-winning lord, cattle-raiser.
Urien he, renowned chieftain,
Constrains rulers and cuts them down,
Eager for war, true leader of Christendom.
Prydain's men, they came in war-bands:
Gwen Ystrad your base, battle-honer.
Neither field nor forest shielded,
Land's protector, your foe when he came.
Like waves roaring harsh over land
I saw savage men in war-bands.
And after morning's fray, torn flesh.
I saw hordes of invaders dead;
Joyous, wrathful, the shout one heard.
Defending Gwen Ystrad one saw
A thin rampart and lone weary men.
At the ford I saw men stained with blood
Down arms before a grey-haired lord.
They wish peace, for they found the way barred,
Hands crossed, on the strand, cheeks pallid.
Their lords marvel at Idon's lavish wine;
Waves wash the tails of their horses.
I saw pillaging men disheartened,
And blood spattered on garments,
And quick groupings, ranks closed, for battle.
Battle's cloak, he'd no mind to flee,
Rheged's lord, I marvel, when challenged.
I saw splendid men around Urien
When he fought his foes at Llech Wen.
Routing does in fury delights him.
Carry, warriors, shields at the ready;
Battle's the lot of those who serve Urien.

And until I die, old,
By death's strict demand,
I shall not be joyful
Unless I praise Urien.
