= Mynyddog Mwynfawr =

Mynyddog Mwynfawr (variant orthographies include: Old Welsh Mynydawc Mwynvawr; Middle Welsh; Mynyddawg Mwynfawr) was, according to Welsh tradition founded on the early Welsh language poem Y Gododdin (attributed to Aneirin), a Brittonic ruler of the kingdom of Gododdin in the Hen Ogledd ("Old North"; a Welsh language term for Celtic Scotland and northern England).

The traditional reading of Y Gododdin, accepted by most scholars, is that Mynyddog is king of Gododdin, perhaps with his court at Din Eidyn, modern Edinburgh. He appears as the sponsor of the renowned warband that fought at the Battle of Catraeth in the early Welsh poem.

The name Mynyddog Mwynfawr, if translated as a personal name, means Mynyddog the Wealthy. The name Mynyddog is the adjectival form of mynydd "mountain" (i.e. "mountainous"). John T. Koch considers Mynyddog Mwynfawr to be a place (meaning approximately "Wealthy Mountain"). Koch argues that Mynyddog Mwynfawr is a kenning or personification which represents Din Eidyn, Gododdin, or perhaps the entire Old North, and that Gwlyget, described as Mynyddog's steward, is the ruler of Gododdin.

The popular Welsh poet Richard Davies (1833–1877) adopted the name Mynyddog as his pen name. Use of an adopted Welsh-language pen name was common among Welsh poets of his era.

== Sources ==
- Rachel Bromwich (ed.), Trioedd Ynys Prydein (University of Wales Press, 1978; new edition, 1991)
- Chris Lowe, Angels, Fools and Tyrants: Britons and Saxons in Southern Scotland (Canongate Books and Historic Scotland, 1999)
- Ifor Williams (ed.), Canu Aneirin (University of Wales Press, 1958). The standard edition of Y Gododdin.
