= Book of Aneirin =

Late 13th century Welsh poetic manuscript

- NLW Llyfr Aneirin, Cardiff MS 2.81
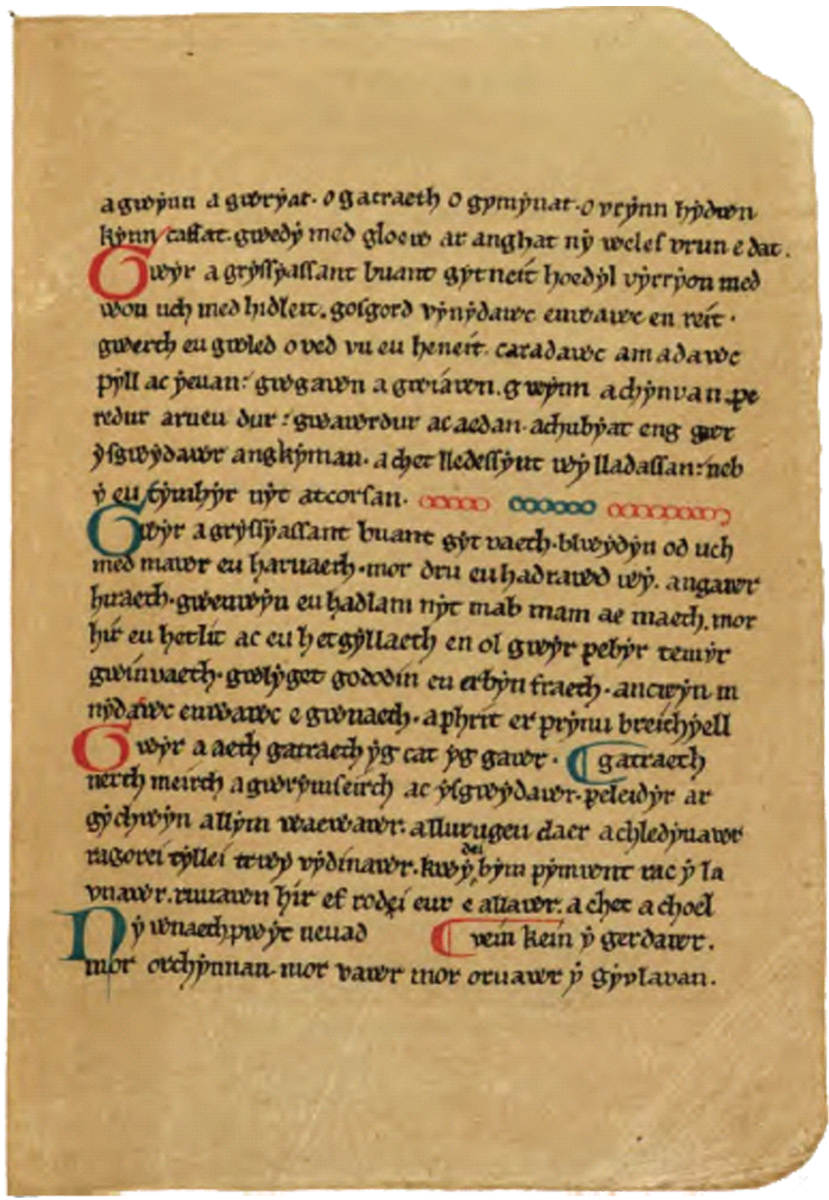
- Facsimile of page 9
- Also known as: Llyfr Aneirin
- Date: Late 13th century
- Language(s): Old and Middle Welsh
- Scribe: Unknown
- Author: Aneirin
- Size: 38 pages

The Book of Aneirin (Welsh: Llyfr Aneirin) is a late 13th century Welsh manuscript containing Old and Middle Welsh poetry attributed to the late 6th century Northern Brythonic poet, Aneirin, who is believed to have lived in present-day Scotland.

The manuscript is kept at the National Library of Wales, Aberystwyth. It is made of parchment and was written in Wales around 1265, probably in a monastery, but is probably a copy of a lost 9th century original. The text of the manuscript is rendered in a proto-gothic hand. There is minimal decoration, consisting only of a few colored Lombardic Capitals. Paragraphs are broken by similarly colored pilcrows and where the text breaks before the right margin, simple illustrated linear termini are provided.

The poetry recorded in the book, which has only 38 pages, would previously have been kept alive through oral tradition. The best-known poem contained within its pages is Y Gododdin, an early Welsh-language poem commemorating the warriors from Gododdin (Lothian in modern Scotland) who fell at the Battle of Catraeth (probably Catterick in North Yorkshire) around the year 600. Parts of this do appear to be contemporary with Aneirin, who, it is claimed, was a survivor of the battle. Military activities are described in great detail in the poem.

The other poetry, with no connection to this battle, includes, amongst others, "Peis Dinogat", a short poem for a child named Dinogad, in the form of a lullaby, describing how his father goes hunting and fishing. The literary scholar, Sir Ifor Williams, suggested that its incongruous presence within the Book of Aneirin might have been the result of it having been written in the margin of the original manuscript.

The other works in the volume are an elegy to a victim of a massacre, and "The true verses of Gorchan Adrefon and Gorchan Maeldderw", which is attributed to the poet Taliesin. Sir Ifor Williams proposed that the contents of the manuscript demonstrate that the Welsh language was spoken in northern parts of the British Isles.

During the 15th century, the poet Dafydd Nanmor owned the manuscript, and it later passed into the hands of Robert Vaughan of Hengwrt, a well-known collector. It remained in the Hengwrt collection until the 1780s, when it was stolen. Thomas Price (Carnhuanawc) later acquired it and, following his death in 1848, it was bought by another collector, Sir Thomas Phillipps, 1st Baronet. In 1896 it was bought by Cardiff Free Library and thus passed to the National Library of Wales, where it has been restored and rebound.
