= Madog Elfed =

Hero in the medieval Welsh poem Y Gododdin

Madog Elfed (Modern Welsh spelling; Madawc Elvet in standardised Middle Welsh spelling) is a hero mentioned in the medieval Welsh poem Y Gododdin, set sometime around 600, who fights and dies at the Battle of Catraeth. His real place in history has been the subject of debate.

The name Madog appears several times in Y Gododdin. In one stanza, it is associated with the epithet Elfed:

Welsh text as found in Llyfr Aneirin	Speculative reconstruction of putative early text by John T. Koch
Neut eryueis y ued ar yg kerdet gwinuaeth rac catraeth yn vn gwaret pan ladhei ae lavnawr ynysgoget yn dayr nyt oed wael men yt welet nyt oed hyll ydellyll en emwaret. atwythic scyndauc madauc eluet.	Ar·ïbẹs med ar-ï·cerdet. Guinmaïth | rac Catraïth | ïn ünguoret. Pan·lade hâ-ï·lamno̧r, an(co)sco̧cet ï·ntaïr. Nït·ȩd guoël | men-ït·guel|et. Nït·ȩd hïll, | ȩd·ellïll | ïn·ïmm-guoret atŭuïthic scẹto̧c | Mato̧c | Elmet.
I drank off mead at one draught On my journey, wine-fed before Catraeth. When he struck with blades, steadfastly And eagerly, his behaviour was not base to see, He was no wretched wraith in giving support. Madog of Elfed was a destructive bearer of a shield.	He drank mead in his mobilisation for hosting. He was wine nourished for Catraeth in that same provision. When he slew with his blades, he was unshaken in battle. He was not weak wherever he was to be seen. The vengeful shield-bearer Madawg of Elmet was not inept, he was a [battle-]sprite providing deliverance.

This is the only stanza clearly to refer specifically to a 'Madog Elfed', but the other mentions of a 'Madog' are usually assumed to refer to the same character: the poem has warriors returning to 'Madog's tent' ('Pebyll Madawc'). Stanza 31 mentions him in passing alongside other fallen warriors. It is possible but not certain that we are to imagine Madog as king of Elfed.

The Elfed in Madog's epithet has traditionally been assumed to refer to the Brittonic kingdom of Elmet in what is now West Yorkshire, in which case Y Gododdin provides interesting evidence for the salience of this kingdom in either post-Roman history, later Welsh literary imagination, or both. However, recent work has suggested that the name Elfed could have occurred elsewhere in Britain too, including Elvet near Durham, and Elvet Hundred in Carmarthenshire, and that Madog Elfed might in fact have been imagined to have come from either of those.
