= John James (writer) =

Welsh author of historical novels (1923–1993)

David John James (30 November 1923 – 2 October 1993) was a Welsh author of historical novels.

== Life and work ==
John James was born in Aberavon. His family were poor and his father was a steelworker who had left school at 13 to work in the tin works. John was largely self-taught, reading the entire works of Shakespeare under his bedclothes with a torch before he was 8 years old. He studied philosophy at St David's University College, Lampeter, and also read and completed BA (converted to an MA) in psychology at Selwyn College, Cambridge. He became a psychologist for the Ministry of Defence, lecturing on the selection and training of air crews for the RAF at Brampton. Writing was a hobby.

He is known for writing four historical novels set in Roman and early medieval Britain and Europe. Some of these novels, including Votan and Not For All The Gold In Ireland, feature characters from Norse and Celtic mythology. Neil Gaiman is an admirer of James, especially his novel Votan, which provided one model for American Gods, calling it “I think probably the best book ever done about the Norse”. James's skilful evocation of life and myths of Dark Age Europe also won him the admiration of neo-pagan authors John and Caitlin Matthews. The British writer Byron Rogers said that whereas "other historical novelists cheat" by putting people with modern opinions and sensitivities into the past, John James "had a man from the past as his hero"; James "knew how such a man would have dressed and what he would have eaten, and, what is far more important, he knew what went on in his head".

John James died in Cambridge in 1993 and is buried in the graveyard at Strata Florida Abbey in Wales.

== Bibliography ==
=== Fiction ===
- Votan (1966). Merchant Photinus the Greek travels into Germanic lands where he inspires rumours which lead to the creation of Norse mythology.
- Not For All The Gold In Ireland (1968). Photinus the Greek travels in Britain and Ireland and encounters situations from Celtic myth.
- Men Went to Cattræth (1969). More serious than his earlier novels this recounts the tragic story of Battle of Catterick using the Y Gododdin of Aneirin as a source.
- Seventeen of Leyden (1970). The adventures of Dr Richard Wormset, Physician and Number Seventeen of Leyden in the Knotte (the formidable secret service of His Majesty King James II), as he sails in pursuit of his betrothed, who has been transported to the Indies for complicity in the Duke of Monmouth's rebellion.
- Lords of Loone (1972). A story of country life in 18th century Britain.
- Bridge of Sand (1976). Set in Roman Britain. Juvenal the satirist leads Roman troops to conquer Ireland via a mysterious rumoured bridge of sand.
- Talleyman (1986). A novel based on fictional Thomas Talleyman, a Lieutenant in the Navy in 1847.
- Talleyman on Ice (1989). Further adventures of Thomas Talleyman en route Murmansk on The Flamingo.
- The Fourth Gwenevere (2014). A tale of King Arthur's fourth wife. Published posthumously with John and Caitlin Matthews, who edited existing material into a full novel.

=== Non-fiction ===
- The Paladins (1990). A social history of the RAF up to the outbreak of World War II.
