= Talhaearn Tad Awen =

Talhaearn Tad Awen (fl mid-6th century), was, according to medieval Welsh sources, a celebrated British poet of the sub-Roman period. He ranks as one of the earliest, if not the earliest, named poets to have composed and performed in Welsh. The better known poets Aneirin and Taliesin, who may have been slightly younger contemporaries, also belong to this early generation, the first of those known to modern scholars as the Cynfeirdd ("first poets"). Whereas medieval Welsh manuscripts preserve verse composed by or otherwise ascribed to the latter two figures, no such work survives for Talhaearn and in fact, his former fame seems to have largely vanished by the later Middle Ages.

== Historia Brittonum ==
An interpolated passage in the Historia Brittonum (9th century) describes him as a famous poet, along with Aneirin, Taliesin and two lesser known figures, Blwchfardd and Cian:

Tunc Talhaern Tat Aguen in poemate claruit, et Neirin, et Taliessin, et Bluchbard, et Cian qui vocatur Gue[ni]th Guaut, simul uno tempore in poemate Brittanico claruerunt.
"Then Talhaearn Tad Awen (MS. Talhaern Tataguen) was renowned in poetry, and Neirin and Taliessin and Bluchbard and Cian, who is called Gueinth Guaut, together at the same time were renowned in British poetry."

The epithet Tataguen or the later form Tad Awen means "father of the Muse" or "father of (poetic) inspiration", and his first name, which has in common with Taliesin the first element tal ("brow, forehead"), translates as "Shining-brow". The context of the passage seems to link these five poets to the middle of the 6th century, when an otherwise unknown chieftain called Eudeyrn (MS. [O]utigirn) fought against the English, notably Ida, king of Bernicia, and when Maelgwn ruled the kingdom of Gwynedd. Talhaearn's honorific nickname and the place accorded to him in the enumeration of British poets may indicate that he was regarded as the "father" of early Welsh poetry, possibly preceding the others by a short period.

== Allusions in Middle Welsh poetry ==
The figure of Talhaearn makes brief side-appearances in several later, Middle Welsh texts. In the Welsh Triads, nos. 33 and 34, his patron appears to be same chieftain who killed Aneirin. The first of these, Triad 33, holds one Heidyn son of Enygan or Heiden son of Efengad, possibly a ruler of the "Old North", responsible for a fatal hatchet-blow on Aneirin's head. In the version of this triad found in the White Book of Rhydderch, Heiden is identified as "the man who used to give a hundred kine every Saturday in a bath-tub to Talhaearn". The precise nature of these rewards remains unclear; can muv may, for instance, be a scribal error for can mu, a unit of value described elsewhere. In any event, the probability is that Heiden was Talhaearn's patron and it is possible therefore that the passage alludes a lost story about rivalry between the two great poets. Listing the "Three Unfortunate Hatchet-Blows" of Britain, Triad 34 also alludes to the anecdote (though using the variant name Eidyn), but only one late manuscript version of the triad mentions Talhaearn.

Further mention of Talhaearn is made in a difficult Middle Welsh poem entitled Angar Kyfyndawt, which is singly preserved in the Book of Taliesin. Taliesin is staged here as the first- and third-person speaker of the poem, who presents himself as a skilled and inspired poet. In passing, he is made to refer, once to Cian and twice to Talhaearn. Talhaearn is praised as the "greatest of the wise men" (mwyhaf y sywedyd), a reputation which is hinted at some lines earlier. The edition and the translation attempted by Sarah Lynn Higley runs as follows:

kerdwn duw yssyd
trwy ieith talhayarn.
bedyd budyd varn.
Avarnwys teithi
angerd vardoni.

Translation:

It is God's minstrel [kerdwn emended to kerdwr "singer, musician"],
through the language of Talhaearn, [cf. trwy ieith taliessin "through the language of Taliesin", line 7]
the baptism of the diviner of judgment,
who judged the qualities
of the gift of poetry.

== See also ==
- John Jones (Talhaiarn)
