= Y Gododdin =

Medieval Welsh poem

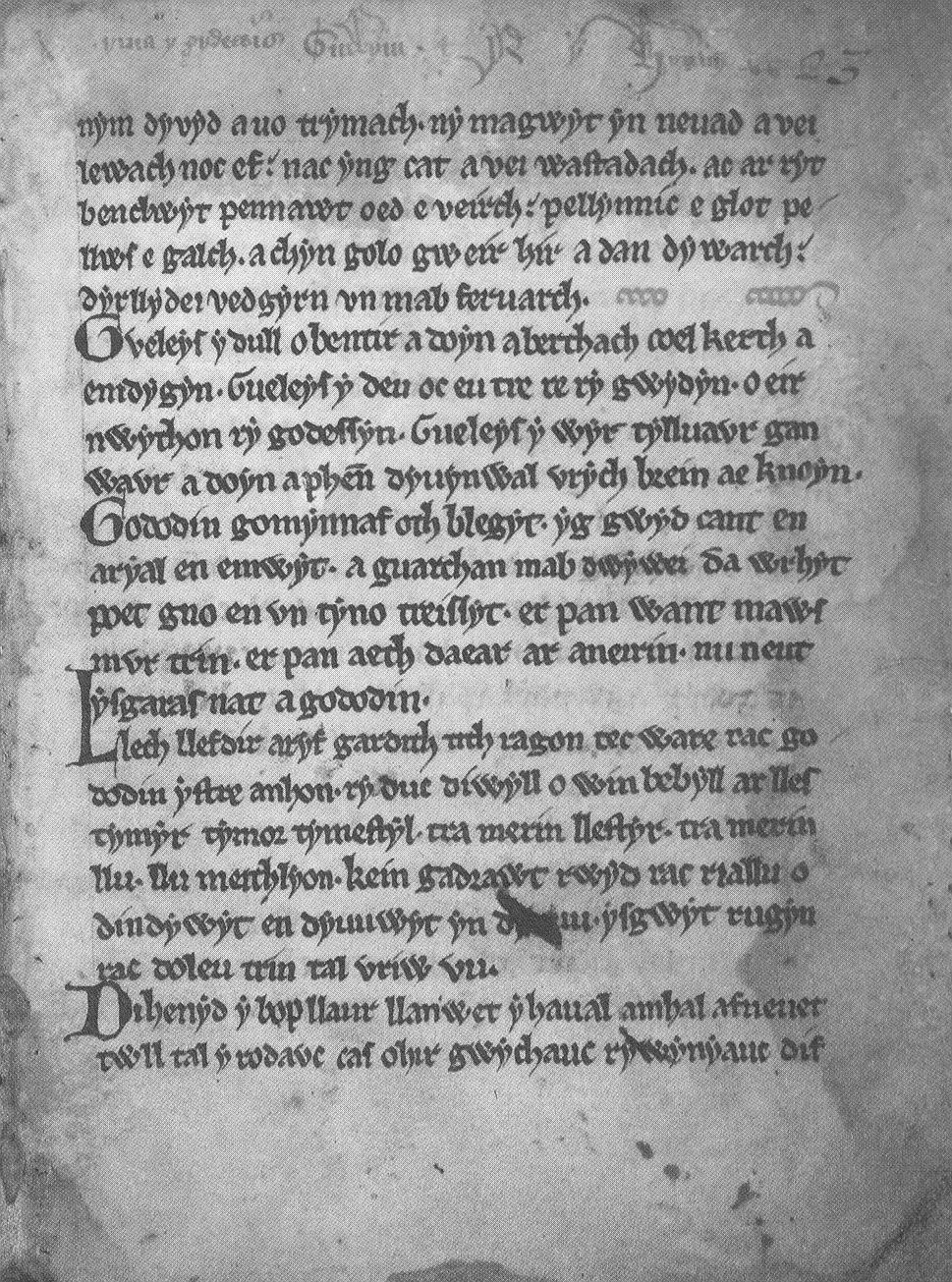
- Page from the Book of Aneirin, showing the first part of the text added by Scribe B
- Author(s): anonymous
- Ascribed to: Aneirin
- Language: Old Welsh and Middle Welsh
- Date: disputed (7th–11th century)
- Manuscript(s): Book of Aneirin (second half of the 13th century)
- Genre: heroic and elegiac poetry
- Setting: especially Mynyddog's feasts at Din Eidyn and the disastrous battle at Catraeth
- Period covered: Hen Ogledd
- Personages: include Mynyddog Mwynfawr

Y Gododdin (Welsh: [əː ɡɔˈdɔðɪn]) is a medieval Welsh poem consisting of a series of elegies to the men of the Brittonic kingdom of Gododdin and its allies who, according to the conventional interpretation, died fighting the Angles of Deira and Bernicia at a place named Catraeth in about AD 600. It is traditionally ascribed to the bard Aneirin and survives only in one manuscript, the "Book of Aneirin".

The Book of Aneirin manuscript is from the later 13th century, but Y Gododdin has been dated to between the 7th and the early 11th centuries. The text is partly written in Middle Welsh orthography and partly in Old Welsh. The early date would place its oral composition soon after the battle, presumably in the Hen Ogledd ("Old North"); as such it would have originated in the Cumbric dialect of Common Brittonic. Others consider it the work of a poet from Wales in the 9th, 10th, or 11th century. Even a 9th-century date would make it one of the oldest surviving Welsh works of poetry.

The Gododdin, known in Roman times as the Votadini, held territories in what is now southeast Scotland and Northumberland, part of the Hen Ogledd. The poem tells how a force of 300 (or 363) picked warriors were assembled, some from as far afield as Pictland and Gwynedd. After a year of feasting at Din Eidyn, now Edinburgh, they attacked Catraeth, which is usually identified with Catterick, North Yorkshire. After several days of fighting against overwhelming odds, nearly all the warriors were killed. The poem is similar in ethos to heroic poetry, with the emphasis on the heroes fighting primarily for glory, but is not a narrative.

The manuscript contains several stanzas which have no connection with the Gododdin and are considered to be interpolations. One stanza in particular has received attention because it mentions a hero called Arthur in passing, which, if not an interpolation, might be the earliest known reference to King Arthur.

== Book of Aneirin ==
=== Manuscript ===
Only one early manuscript of Y Gododdin is known, the Book of Aneirin, thought to date from the second half of the 13th century. The currently accepted view is that this manuscript contains the work of two scribes, usually known as A and B. Scribe A wrote down 88 stanzas of the poem, (Note: The manuscript separates stanzas by the use of large capitals, but does not separate the text into lines. The arrangement used by most editors follows that used by Ifor Williams in his 1938 edition.) then left a blank page before writing down four related poems known as Gorchanau. (Note: Klar, O Hehir, and Sweetser considered that a third scribe, whom they called C, wrote the text of the Gorchanau. This view is disputed by Huws, who considers that these were the work of Scribe A. See Huws (1989), pp. 34, 48.) This scribe wrote the material down in Middle Welsh orthography. Scribe B added material later, and apparently had access to an earlier manuscript since the material added by this scribe is in Old Welsh orthography. Scribe B wrote 35 stanzas, some of which are variants of stanzas also given by Scribe A, while others are not given by A. The last stanza is incomplete and three folios are missing from the end of the manuscript, so some material may have been lost.

Differences exist within the material added by Scribe B. The first 23 stanzas of the B material show signs of partial modernisation of the orthography, while the remainder shows much more retention of Old Welsh features. Jarman explains this by suggesting that Scribe B started by partially modernising the orthography as he copied the stanzas, but after a while tired of this and copied the remaining stanzas as they were in the older manuscript. Isaac suggested that Scribe B was using two sources, called B1 and B2. If this is correct, the material in the Book of Aneirin is from three sources.

=== Poem ===
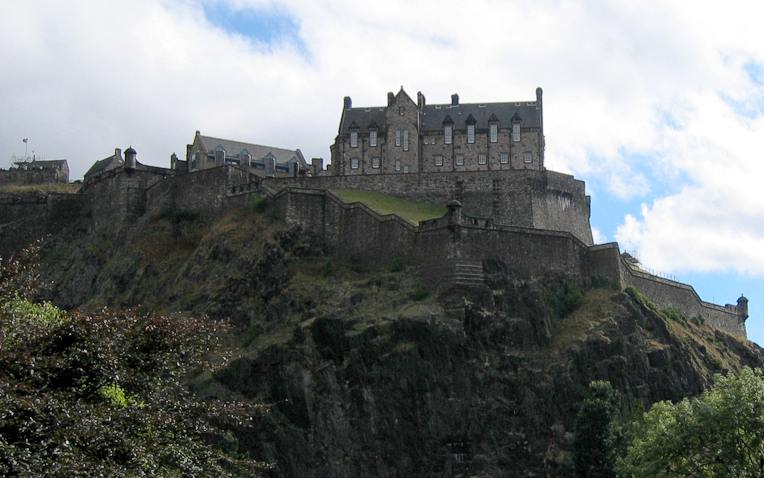
Edinburgh Castle viewed from Princes Street: Around 600 AD, this may have been the site of the hall of Mynyddog Mwynfawr, where the warriors feasted before setting forth to battle.

The stanzas that make up the poem (Note: O Hehir considers that Y Gododdin is better understood as a collection of poems on related topics. See O Hehir, p. 66.) are a series of elegies for warriors who fell in battle against vastly superior numbers. Some of the verses refer to the entire host, and others eulogize individual heroes. They tell how the ruler of the Gododdin, Mynyddog Mwynfawr, gathered warriors from several Brittonic kingdoms and provided them with a year's feasting and drinking mead in his halls at Din Eidyn, before launching a campaign in which almost all of them were killed fighting against overwhelming odds. (Note: One stanza mentions 100,000 of the enemy, another mentions a ratio of 180 for each one of the warriors of the Gododdin.) The poetry is based on a fixed number of syllables, though some irregularity occurs, which may be due to modernisation of the language during oral transmission. It uses rhyme, both end-rhyme and internal, and some parts use alliteration. A number of stanzas may open with the same words, for example "Gwyr a aeth gatraeth gan wawr" ("Men went to Catraeth at dawn").

The collection appears to have been compiled from two different versions: according to some verses, there were 300 men of the Gododdin, and only one, Cynon ap Clydno, survived; others have 363 warriors and three survivors, in addition to the poet, who as a bard, almost certainly would not have been counted as one of the warriors. The names of about 80 warriors are given in the poem. (Note: The names are listed in Jarman (1998), pp. xxx–xxxi.)

The Book of Aneirin begins with the introduction "Hwn yw e Gododin. Aneirin ae cant" ("This is the Gododdin; Aneirin sang it"). A stanza, a version of which is found in both texts, but which forms the beginning of the B text, appears to be a reciter's prologue:

Gododin, gomynnaf oth blegyt
yg gwyd cant en aryal en emwyt: ...
er pan want maws mur trin,
er pan aeth daear ar Aneirin,
nu neut ysgaras nat a Gododin.

Translation:

Gododdin, I make claim on thy behalf
In the presence of the throng boldly in the court: ...
Since the gentle one, the wall of battle, was slain,
Since the earth covered Aneirin,
Poetry is now parted from the Gododdin.

Text A begins with an awdl in praise of an individual hero:

In might a man, a youth in years,
Of boisterous valour,
Swift long-maned steeds
Under the thigh of a handsome youth …
Quicker to a field of blood
Than to a wedding
Quicker to the ravens' feast
Than to a burial,
A beloved friend was Ywain,
It is wrong that he is beneath a cairn. (Note: Jarman (1998) emends the dan vrein ('under ravens') given in the MS to dan vein ('under stones', i.e. 'beneath a cairn'). This stanza is one of the best-known parts of the poem, but is considered by most authors to be a later addition on the basis of a rhyme which would not be possible in Primitive Welsh. The stanza does not mention "Gododdin" or "Catraeth".)
It is a sad wonder to me in what land
Marro's only son was slain.

Other stanzas praise the entire host, for example number 13:

Men went to Catraeth at morn
Their high spirits lessened their life-span
They drank mead, gold and sweet, ensnaring;
For a year the minstrels were merry.
Red their swords, let the blades remain
Uncleansed, white shields and four-sided spearheads,
Before Mynyddog Mwynfawr's men.

Mead is mentioned in many stanzas, sometimes with the suggestion that it is linked to their deaths. This led some 19th-century editors to assume that the warriors went into battle drunk, (Note: This idea goes back at least to Turner in 1803.) however Williams explained that "mead" here stood for everything the warriors received from their lord. In return, they were expected to "pay their mead" by being loyal to their lord unto death. A similar concept is found in Anglo-Saxon poetry. The heroes commemorated in the poem are mounted warriors; there are many references to horses in the poem. There are references to spears, swords and shields, and to the use of armour (llurug, from the Latin lorica). There are several references which indicate that they were Christians, for example "penance" and "altar", while the enemy are described as "heathens". Several of these features can be seen in stanza 33:

Men went to Catraeth with a war-cry,
Speedy steeds and dark armour and shields,
Spear-shafts held high and spear-points sharp-edged,
And glittering coats-of-mail and swords,
He led the way, he thrust through armies,
Five companies fell before his blades.
Rhufawn His gave gold to the altar,
And a rich reward to the minstrel."

However, D. Simon Evans has suggested that most, if not all, of the references which point to Christianity may be later additions.

Many personal names are given, but only two are recorded in other sources. One of the warriors was Cynon ap Clydno, whom Williams identifies with the Cynon ap Clydno Eiddin who is mentioned in old pedigrees. The other personal name recorded in other sources is Arthur. If the mention of Arthur formed part of the original poem this could be the earliest reference to King Arthur, as a paragon of bravery. (Note: Jarman in his 1988 edition lists the stanza as a possible interpolation. Koch in his 1997 study considers the stanza as probably archaic, before 638. Within the stanza, the reference to Arthur is proved by the rhyme. See Koch (1997), pp. 147–8.) In stanza 99, the poet praises one of the warriors, Gwawrddur:

He fed black ravens on the rampart of a fortress
Though he was no Arthur
Among the powerful ones in battle
In the front rank, Gwawrddur was a palisade

Many of the warriors were not from the lands of the Gododdin. Among the places mentioned are Aeron, thought to be the area around the River Ayr and Elfed, the area around Leeds still called Elmet. Others came from further afield, for example one came from "beyond Bannog", a reference to the mountains between Stirling (thought to have been Manaw Gododdin territory) and Dumbarton (chief fort of the Brittonic Kingdom of Strathclyde) – this warrior must have come from Pictland. Others came from Gwynedd in north Wales.

=== Interpolations ===
Three of the stanzas included in the manuscript have no connection with the subject matter of the remainder except that they are also associated with southern Scotland or northern England rather than Wales. One of these is a stanza which celebrates the victory of the Britons of the Kingdom of Strathclyde under Eugein I, here described as "the grandson of Neithon", over Domnall Brecc ("Dyfnwal Frych" in Welsh), king of Dál Riata, at the Battle of Strathcarron in 642:

I saw an array that came from Kintyre (Note: Pentir in the original.)
who brought themselves as a sacrifice to a holocaust.
I saw a second [array] who had come down from their settlement,
who had been roused by the grandson of Neithon.
I saw mighty men who came with dawn.
And it was Domnall Brecc's head that the ravens gnawed.

Another stanza appears to be part of the separate cycle of poems associated with Llywarch Hen. The third interpolation is a poem entitled "Dinogad's Smock", a cradle-song addressed to a baby named Dinogad, describing how his father goes hunting and fishing. The interpolations are thought to have been added to the poem after it had been written down, these stanzas first being written down where there was a space in the manuscript, then being incorporated in the poem by a later copier who failed to realise that they did not belong. The Strathcarron stanza, for example, is the first stanza in the B text of the Book of Aneirin, and Kenneth H. Jackson has suggested that it had probably been inserted on a blank space at the top of the first page of the original manuscript. According to John T. Koch's reconstruction, this stanza was deliberately added to the text in Strathclyde.

== Analysis and interpretation ==
=== Date ===
The date of Y Gododdin has been the subject of debate among scholars since the early 19th century. If the poem was composed soon after the battle, it must predate 638, when the fall of Din Eidyn was recorded in the reign of Oswy king of Bernicia, an event which is thought to have meant the collapse of the kingdom of the Gododdin. If it is a later composition, the latest date which could be ascribed to it is determined by the orthography of the second part of Scribe B's text. This is usually considered to be that of the 9th or 10th centuries, although some scholars consider that it could be from the 11th century.

Most of the debate about the date of the poem has employed linguistic arguments, mostly concerning rhyme (since more is known about early Welsh phonology than other aspects of the language, like syntax). It is believed that around the time of the battle, the British language was transitioning into its daughter languages: the primitive form of Welsh in Wales, of Cornish and Breton in southwestern Britain and Brittany, and Cumbric in northern Britain. Kenneth H. Jackson concluded that the majority of the changes that transformed British into Primitive Welsh belong to the period from the middle of the 5th to the end of the 6th century. This involved syncope and the loss of final syllables. If the poem dates to this time, it would have originated in an early form of Cumbric, the usual name for the Brittonic speech of the Hen Ogledd. Jackson suggested the name "Primitive Cumbric" for the dialect spoken at the time.

Sweetser gives the example of the name Cynfelyn found in Y Gododdin; in British this would have been Cunobelinos. The middle unstressed o and the final unstressed os have been lost. Ifor Williams, whose 1938 text laid the foundations for modern scholarly study of the poetry, considered that part of it could be regarded as being of likely late 6th-century origin. This would have been orally transmitted for a period before being written down. Dillon cast doubt on the date of composition, arguing that it is unlikely that by the end of the 6th century Primitive Welsh would have developed into a language "not notably earlier than that of the ninth century". He suggests that the poetry may have been composed in the 9th century on traditional themes and attributed to Aneirin. Jackson however considers that there is "no real substance" in these arguments, and points out that the poetry would have been transmitted orally for a long period before being written down, and would have been modernised by reciters, and that there is in any case nothing in the language used which would rule out a date around 600. Koch suggests a rather earlier date, about 570, and also suggests that the poem may have existed in written form by the 7th century, much earlier than usually thought. Koch, reviewing the arguments about the date of the poetry in 1997, states:

Today, the possibility of an outright forgery – which would amount to the anachronistic imposition of a modern literary concept onto early Welsh tradition – is no longer in serious contention. Rather, the narrowing spectrum of alternatives ranges from a Gododdin corpus which is mostly a literary creation of mediaeval Wales based on a fairly slender thread of traditions from the old Brittonic North to a corpus which is in large part recoverable as a text actually composed in that earlier time and place.

Koch himself believes that a considerable part of the poem can be dated to the 6th century. Greene in 1971 considered that the language of the poem was 9th-century rather than 6th-century, and Isaac, writing in 1999, stated that the linguistic evidence did not necessitate dating the poem as a whole before the 9th or 10th century.

The other approach to dating the poetry has been to look at it from a historical point of view. Charles-Edwards writing in 1978 concluded that:

The historical arguments, therefore, suggest that the poem is the authentic work of Aneirin; that we can establish the essential nature of the poem from the two surviving versions; but that we cannot, except in favourable circumstances, establish the wording of the original.

Dumville, commenting on these attempts to establish the historicity of the poem in 1988, said, "The case for authenticity, whatever exactly we mean by that, is not proven; but that does not mean that it cannot be." Likewise, Patrick Sims-Williams concluded in 2016 that, 'evaluating the supposed proofs that poems in the Books of Aneirin and Taliesin cannot go back to the sixth century, we have found them either to be incorrect or to apply to only a very few lines or stanzas that may be explained as additions. It seems impossible to prove, however, that any poem must go back to the sixth century linguistically and cannot be a century or more later'. The fact that the great majority of the warriors mentioned in the poem are not known from other sources has been put forward by several authors as an argument against the idea that the poem could be a later composition. The poems which are known to be later "forgeries" have clearly been written for a purpose, for example to strengthen the claims of a particular dynasty. The men commemorated in Y Gododdin do not appear in the pedigrees of any Welsh dynasty. Breeze comments, "it is difficult to see why a later poet should take the trouble to commemorate men who, but for the poem, would be forgotten".

=== Background ===
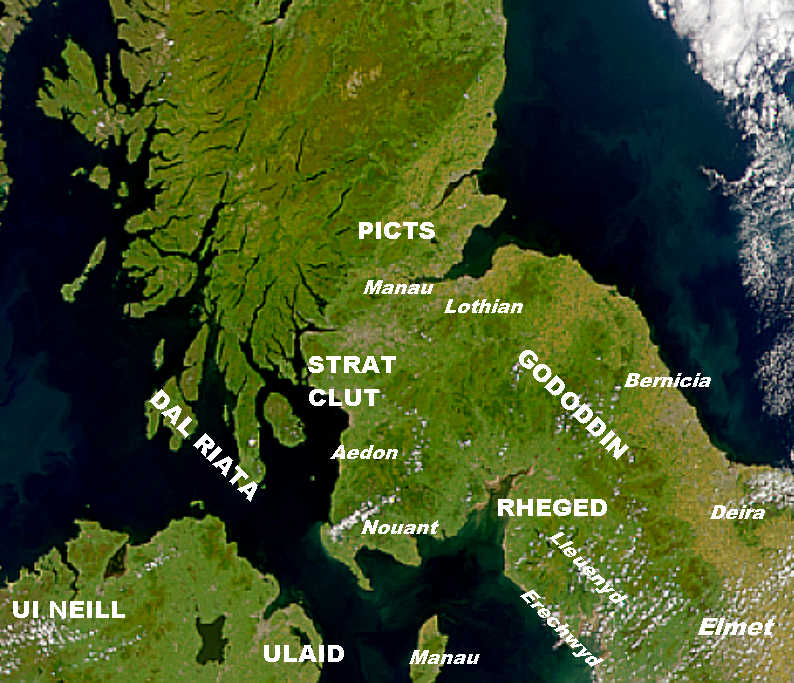
The Gododdin and neighbouring kingdoms

The poem is set in the area which is now southern Scotland and north-east England. Around the year 600 this area included a number of Brittonic kingdoms. Apart from the Gododdin, the kingdom of Alt Clut occupied the Strathclyde area and Rheged covered parts of Galloway, Lancashire and Cumbria. Further south lay the kingdom of Elmet in the Leeds area. These areas made up what was later known in Welsh as Yr Hen Ogledd (The Old North). The Gododdin, known as the Votadini in the Romano-British period, occupied a territory from the area around the head of the Firth of Forth as far south as the River Wear. In modern terms their lands included much of Clackmannanshire and the Lothian and Borders regions. Their capital at this period may have been called Din Eidyn, now known as Edinburgh. By this time the area that later became Northumbria had been invaded and increasingly occupied by the Anglo-Saxon kingdoms of Deira and Bernicia.

In the Historia Brittonum, attributed to Nennius, there is a reference to several poets in this area during the 6th century. Having mentioned Ida of Bernicia, the founder of the Northumbrian royal line who ruled between 547 and 559, the Historia goes on to say:

At that time Talhaearn the Father of the Muse was famous in poetry, and Neirin, Taliesin, Blwchfardd and Cian who is called Gweinthgwawd, at one and the same time were renowned in British poetry.

Nothing has been preserved of the work of Talhaearn, Blwchfardd and Cian, but poems attributed to Taliesin were published by Ifor Williams in Canu Taliesin and were considered by him to be comparable in antiquity to the Gododdin. This poetry praises Urien of Rheged and his son Owain, and refers to Urien as lord of Catraeth.

=== Interpretation ===
Y Gododdin is not a narrative poem but rather a series of elegies for heroes who died in a battle whose history would have been familiar to the original listeners. The context of the poem has to be worked out from the text itself. There have been various interpretations of the events recorded in the poem. The 19th-century Welsh scholar Thomas Stephens identified Y Gododdin with the Votadini and Catraeth as Catterick in North Yorkshire. He linked the poem to the Battle of Degsastan in c. 603 between King Æthelfrith of Bernicia and the Gaels under Áedán mac Gabráin, king of Dál Riada. Gwenogvryn Evans in his 1922 edition and translation of the Book of Aneirin claimed that the poem referred to a battle around the Menai Strait in 1098, emending the text to fit the theory. The generally accepted interpretation for the Battle of Catraeth is that put forward by Ifor Williams in his Canu Aneirin first published in 1938. Williams interpreted mynydawc mwynvawr in the text to refer to a person, Mynyddog Mwynfawr in modern Welsh. Mynyddog, in his version, was the king of the Gododdin, with his chief seat at Din Eidyn (modern Edinburgh). Around the year 600 Mynyddog gathered about 300 select warriors, some from as far afield as Gwynedd. He feasted them at Din Eidyn for a year, then launched an attack on Catraeth, which Williams agrees with Stephens in identifying as Catterick, which was in Anglo-Saxon hands. They were opposed by a larger army from the Anglo-Saxon kingdoms of Deira and Bernicia.

The battle at Catraeth has been seen as an attempt to resist the advance of the Angles, who had probably by then occupied the former Votadini lands of Bryneich in modern north-eastern England and made it their kingdom of Bernicia. At some time after the battle, the Angles absorbed the Gododdin kingdom, possibly after the fall of their capital Din Eidyn in 638, and incorporated it into the kingdom of Northumbria.

This interpretation has been accepted by most modern scholars. Jackson accepts the interpretation but suggests that a force of 300 men would be much too small to undertake the task demanded of them. He considers that the 300 mounted warriors would have been accompanied by a larger number of foot soldiers, not considered worthy of mention in the poem. Jarman also follows Williams' interpretation. Jackson suggested that after the fall of the kingdom of Gododdin, in or about 638, the poem was preserved in Strathclyde, which maintained its independence for several centuries. He considers that it was first written down in Strathclyde after a period of oral transmission, and may have reached Wales in manuscript form between the end of the 8th and the end of the 9th century. There would be particular interest in matters relating to the Gododdin in Gwynedd, since the founding myth of the kingdom involved the coming of Cunedda Wledig from Manaw Gododdin.

=== Alternative interpretation ===
In 1997, John T. Koch published a new study of Y Gododdin which involved an attempt to reconstruct the original poetry written in what Koch terms "Archaic Neo-Brittonic". This work also included a new and very different interpretation of the background of the poetry. He draws attention to a poem in Canu Taliesin entitled Gweith Gwen Ystrat ('Battle of Gwen Ystrat'):

The men of Catraeth arise with the day
around a battle-victorious, cattle-rich sovereign
this is Uryen by name, the most senior leader.

There is also a reference to Catraeth in the slightly later poem Moliant Cadwallon, a panegyric addressed to Cadwallon ap Cadfan of Gwynedd, thought to have been composed in about 633. (Note: Woolf has recently suggested that the British king Caedualla, who led a coalition including Penda of Mercia to overthrow and kill Edwin, king of Deira, was from northern England, rather than Gwynedd. However, this would not affect Koch's argument here.) Two lines in this poem are translated by Koch as "fierce Gwallawc wrought the great and renowned mortality at Catraeth". He identifies Gwallawc as the "Guallauc" who was one of the kings who fought against Bernicia in alliance with Urien. Koch draws attention to the mention of meibion Godebawc (the sons of Godebog) as an enemy in stanza 15 of Y Gododdin and points out that according to old Welsh genealogies Urien and other Brittonic kings were descendants of "Coïl Hen Guotepauc" (Coel Hen). He considers that, in view of the references in the three poems, there is a case for identifying the attack on Catraeth recorded in Y Gododdin with the Battle of Gwen Ystrat. This would date the poem to about 570 rather than the c. 600 favoured by Williams and others. He interprets the Gododdin as having fought the Britons of Rheged and Alt Clut over a power struggle in Elmet, with Anglian allies on both sides, Rheged being in an alliance with Deira. He points out that according to the Historia Britonnum it was Rhun, son of Urien Rheged who baptized the princess Eanflæd of Deira, her father Edwin, and 12,000 of his subjects in 626 or 627. Urien Rheged was thus the real victor of the battle. Mynyddog Mwynfawr was not a person's name but a personal description meaning 'mountain feast' or 'mountain chief'. (Note: Wmffre (2002) agrees that Mynyddog is not a personal name, but suggests that it is a reference to the Christian God. See Wmffre, pp. 83–105.) Some aspects of Koch's view of the historical context have been criticised by both Oliver Padel and Tim Clarkson. Clarkson, for example, makes the point that the reference in Gweith Gwen Ystrat is to "the men of Catraeth"; it does not state that the battle was fought at Catraeth, and also that according to Bede it was Paulinus, not Rhun, who baptized the Deirans.

== Editions and translations ==
The first known translation of Y Gododdin was by Evan Evans ("Ieuan Fardd") who printed ten stanzas with a Latin translation in his book Some Specimens of the Poetry of the Ancient Welsh Bards in 1764. The full text was printed for the first time by Owen Jones in the Myvyrian Archaiology in 1801. English translations of the poem were published by William Probert in 1820 and by John Williams (Ab Ithel) in 1852, followed by translations by William Forbes Skene in his Four Ancient Books of Wales (1866), and by Thomas Stephens for the Cymmrodorion Society in 1888. Gwenogvryn Evans produced a facsimile copy of the Book of Aneirin in 1908 and an edition with a translation in 1922.

The first reliable edition was Canu Aneirin by Ifor Williams with notes in Welsh, published in 1938. New translations based on this work were published by Kenneth H. Jackson in 1969 and, with modernized Welsh text and glossary, by A. O. H. Jarman in 1988. A colour facsimile edition of the manuscript with an introduction by Daniel Huws was published by South Glamorgan County Council and the National Library of Wales in 1989. John T. Koch's new edition, which aimed to recreate the original text, appeared in 1997.

There have also been a number of translations which aim to present the Gododdin as literature rather than as a subject of scholarly study. Examples are the translation by Joseph P. Clancy in The earliest Welsh poetry (1970), Steve Short's 1994 translation, and Gillian Clark's version from 2021.

== Cultural influence ==
There are a number of references to Y Gododdin in later Medieval Welsh poetry. The well-known 12th-century poem Hirlas Owain by Owain Cyfeiliog, in which Owain praises his own war-band, likens them to the heroes of the Gododdin and uses Y Gododdin as a model. A slightly later poet, Dafydd Benfras, in a eulogy addressed to Llywelyn the Great, wishes to be inspired "to sing as Aneirin sang / The day he sang the Gododdin". After this period this poetry seems to have been forgotten in Wales for centuries until Evan Evans (Ieuan Fardd) discovered the manuscript in the late 18th century. From the early 19th century onwards there are many allusions in Welsh poetry.

In English, Y Gododdin was a major influence on the long poem In Parenthesis (1937) by David Jones, in which he reflects on the carnage he witnessed in the First World War. Jones put a quotation from Y Gododdin at the beginning of each of the seven sections of In Parenthesis. Another poet writing in English, Richard Caddel, used Y Gododdin as the basis of his difficult but much-admired poem For the Fallen (1997), written in memory of his son Tom. Tony Conran's poem Elegy for the Welsh Dead, in the Falklands Islands, 1982 opens with the line "Men went to Catraeth", using the original poem to comment on a contemporary conflict. The theme and rhythm of Y Gododdin are also the undercurrent for Owen Sheers's Pink Mist (2012), an epic elegy to dead and wounded soldiers who served in Afghanistan; the poem, which drew on 30 interviews with returned servicemen, was originally commissioned for radio and then produced by the Old Vic theatre company as a stage play.

The poem has also inspired a number of historical novels, including Men Went to Cattraeth (1969) by John James, The Shining Company (1990) by Rosemary Sutcliff, and The Amber Treasure (2009) by Richard J Denning. In 1989, the British industrial music band Test Dept. brought out an album titled Gododdin, in which the words of the poem were set to music, part in the original and part in English translation. This was a collaboration with the Welsh avant-garde theatre company Brith Gof and was performed in Wales, Germany, Italy, the Netherlands, and Scotland.
