= Talhaiarn =

Welsh poet and architect (1810–1869)

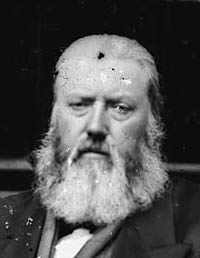
Talhaiarn

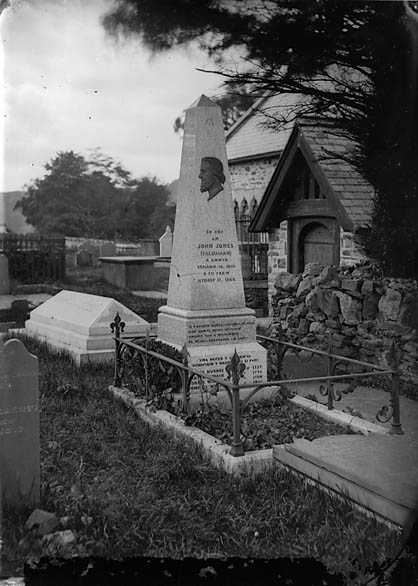
Monument to John Jones, Llanfair Talhaearn, c.1875

John Jones (19 January 1810 – October 1869), known by his bardic name of Talhaiarn, was a Welsh poet and architect.

== Life and reputation ==
Jones was born at the Harp Inn (now known as Hafod y Gân) in Llanfair Talhaearn, Denbighshire. He was probably apprenticed to and then working for the architect and Denbighshire county surveyor Thomas Penson between 1830 and 1843. After that he served with ecclesiastical architects in London, being employed, for instance, by Sir Joseph Paxton to oversee the building of the Crystal Palace. He became a prominent a member of Cymdeithas y Cymreigyddion in London, and its president in 1849.

Suffering from ill health, he returned to Wales in 1865 and in 1869 killed himself by shooting himself in his bedroom at the Harp Inn. He is buried under a yew tree at St Mary's Church in Llanfair Talhaearn.

Talhaiarn lived in England and in France, but wrote in Welsh. His works included well-known lyrics such as Bugeilio'r Gwenith Gwyn (Watching the Wheat), and Mae Robin yn Swil (Robin is Shy). His bardic name is derived conventionally from the place of his birth, but probably refers also to Talhaearn Tad Awen, a noted 6th-century Welsh poet.

Although he was accepted into Gorsedd y Beirdd in Bala in 1869, he is known to have failed several times to win the chair at the Eisteddfod. In 1849 at the Aberffraw eisteddfod he rose to his feet to contest the adjudication and defend his defeated awdl. In 1863 at the Swansea eisteddfod he held that the Nonconformist judges were biased against him as an Anglican.

== Publications ==
John Jones collaborated with John Thomas on compiling a series of books called "Welsh Melodies with Welsh and English Poetry". It was a collaborative work, with Jones creating the Welsh words, Thomas Oliphant, the artist and musician, writing the English (often not a translation) and John Thomas the Welsh composer and harpist, acting as author. There were four volumes, the first two published in 1862, the third in 1870 and the fourth in 1874.
