= Battle of Catraeth =

Sixth-century battle in northern Britain

- Part of the Anglo-Saxon settlement of Britain
- Gododdin warriors, depicted on the cover of Kenneth Jackson’s edition of the Gododdin, set out to battle
Date	c. 570 or c. 600
Location	Modern Catterick, Yorkshire 54°22′38″N 1°37′48″W
Result	Gododdin defeated

Belligerents
Traditionally: Gododdin; Ystrad Clud; Elfed; Rhufoniog; other Northern Britons; John T. Koch's theory: Gododdin; Bernicia; allies of Madog Elfed	Traditionally: Deira; Bernicia; John T. Koch's theory: Rheged; Elfed; Deira

Commanders and leaders
Traditionally: Mynyddog Mwynfawr; Cynon ap Clydno; Madog Elfed; Gorthyn ab Yrfai; various others; John T. Koch's theory: Gwlgod Gododdin; Yrfai ap Golstan; Madog Elfed	Traditionally: Unknown John T. Koch's theory: Urien Rheged; Gwallog ap Llênog

Strength
Unknown	Unknown

Casualties and losses
Heavy	Unknown
- Location of the battle in North Yorkshire Catraeth (the United Kingdom)

The Battle of Catraeth was a battle fought around AD 600 between a force raised by the Gododdin, a Brythonic people of the Hen Ogledd or "Old North" of Britain, and the Angles of Bernicia and Deira. It was evidently an assault by the Gododdin party on the Angle stronghold of Catraeth, perhaps Catterick, North Yorkshire. The Gododdin force was said to have consisted of warriors from all over the Hen Ogledd, and even some from as far afield as Gwynedd in North Wales and Pictland. The battle was disastrous for the Britons, who were nearly all killed. The slain warriors were commemorated in the important early poem Y Gododdin, attributed to Aneirin.

== Battle ==
In his Canu Aneirin, Ifor Williams interpreted mynydawc mwynvawr in the text of Y Gododdin to refer to a person, Mynyddog Mwynfawr in modern Welsh. Mynyddog, in Williams' reading, was the king of the Gododdin, with his chief seat at Din Eidyn (modern Edinburgh). Around the year 600, Mynyddog gathered about 300 select warriors from across the Brythonic world. He feasted them at Din Eidyn for a year, preparing for battle, then launched an attack on Catraeth, which Williams agrees with Thomas Stephens in identifying as Catterick in North Yorkshire, which was in Anglo-Saxon hands. They were opposed by a larger army from the Anglo-Saxon kingdoms of Deira and Bernicia.

In early historical times, this part of northern England and southern Scotland was the territory of the Votadini, the ancestors of the later Gododdin. By 600, the Angles had formed the important kingdoms of Deira and Bernicia, which were possibly originally ruled by Britons. As such, the Battle of Catraeth may have been an attempt to push back Anglo-Saxon expansion. At some time after the battle, the Angles absorbed the Gododdin kingdom and incorporated its territory into the kingdom of Northumbria.

This interpretation has been accepted by most modern scholars. Kenneth H. Jackson accepts the interpretation but suggests that a force of 300 men would be much too small to undertake the task demanded of them. He considers that the 300 mounted warriors would have been accompanied by a larger number of foot soldiers, not considered worthy of mention in the poem. A. O. H. Jarman also follows Williams' interpretation.

== Historical fiction ==
The Battle of Catraeth has appeared in some modern works of fiction. John James used Y Gododdin as the basis for his novel Men went to Cattraeth, originally published 1969. Rosemary Sutcliff's young adult novel The Shining Company (1990) tells the story of the Battle of Catraeth from the viewpoint of Prosper, shield-bearer to one of King Mynyddog's Gododdin warriors. Richard J. Denning's 2010 novel, The Amber Treasure tells the story of the Battle of Catraeth from the point of view of an Anglo-Saxon youth, Cerdic. In Nicola Griffith's novel Hild (2014), one of the main characters, Cian, frequently refers to the epic, as the heroes are aspirational figures to him. In the television show Wolfblood, an episode ("The Dark Ages") revolves around a hoard of treasure buried before the battle of Catraeth by a clan of werewolves who, having died in the battle, were unable to reclaim their relics.

== See also ==
- Battle of Raith
