= Gododdin =

Sub-Roman kingdom of Northern Britain

Kingdom of Gododdin
- circa 4th century
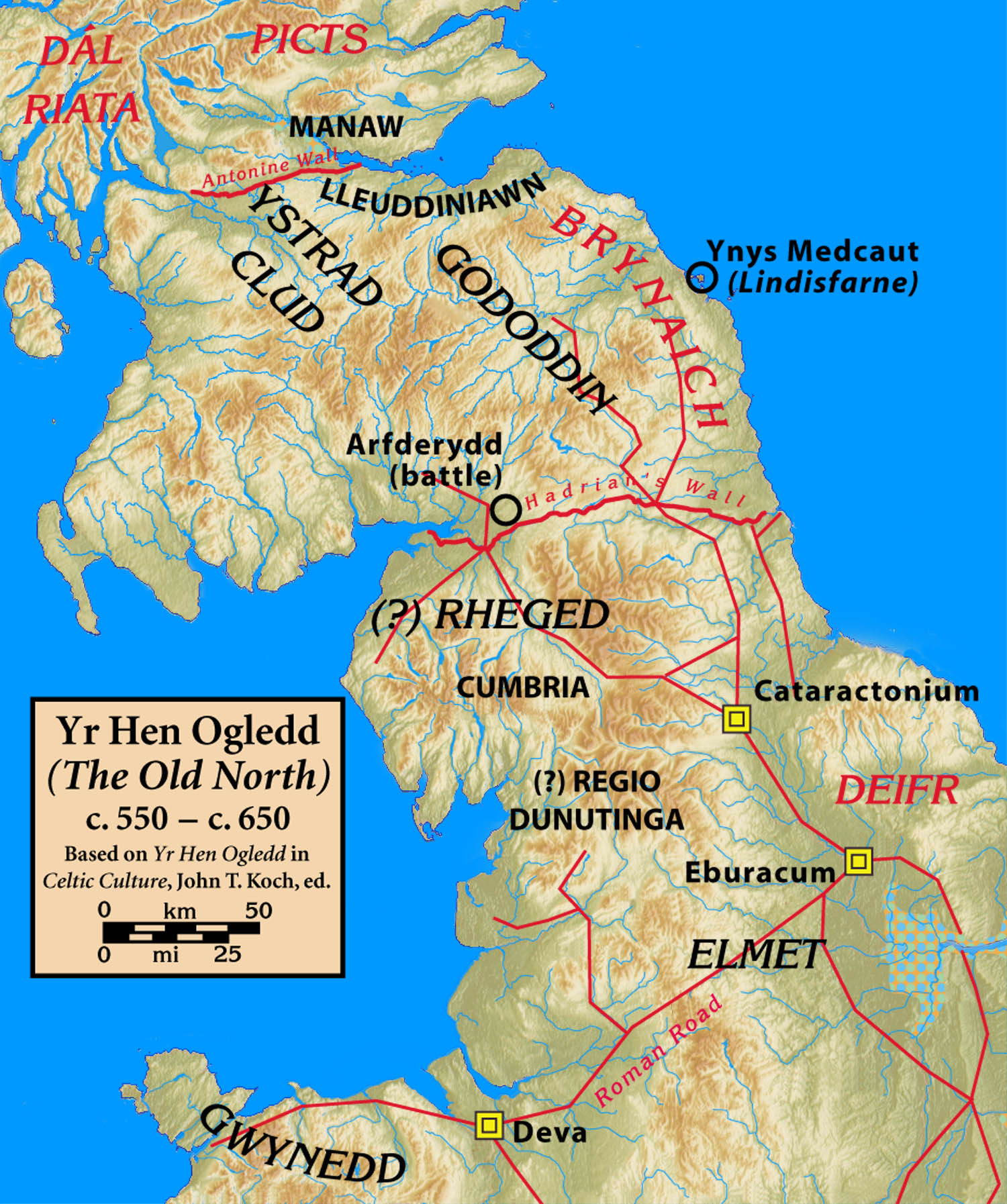
- Yr Hen Ogledd (The Old North) c. 550 – c. 650
- Common languages: Brythonic
- Religion: Celtic Christianity
- Government: Monarchy
- King
- Historical era: Early Middle Ages
  - Established: circa 4th century
Preceded by	Succeeded by
Hen Ogledd; Votadini	Kingdom of Northumbria

The Gododdin (Welsh pronunciation: [ɡɔˈdɔðɪn]) were a Brittonic people of north-eastern Britannia, the area known as the Hen Ogledd or Old North (modern south-east Scotland and north-east England), in the sub-Roman period. Descendants of the Votadini, they are best known as the subject of the 6th-century Welsh poem Y Gododdin, which memorialises the Battle of Catraeth and is attributed to Aneirin.

The name Gododdin is the Modern Welsh form, but the name appeared in Old Welsh as Guotodin and derived from the tribal name Votadini recorded in Classical sources, such as in Greek texts from the Roman period.

== Kingdom ==
It is not known exactly how far the kingdom of the Gododdin extended, possibly from the Stirling area to the kingdom of Bryneich (Bernicia), and including what are now the Lothian and Borders regions of eastern Scotland. It was bounded to the west by the Brittonic Kingdom of Strathclyde, and to the north by the Picts. Those living around Clackmannanshire were known as the Manaw Gododdin. According to tradition, local kings of this period lived at both Traprain Law and Din Eidyn (Edinburgh, whose English name is ultimately a calque, with the Old English -burh corresponding to the Welsh din; in Scottish Gaelic it is still known as Dùn Èideann), and probably also at Din Baer (Dunbar, Scottish Gaelic Dùn Bàrr). Gododdin included districts such as Manaw Gododdin and Eidyn south of the Firth of Forth.

Cunedda, legendary founder of the Kingdom of Gwynedd in north Wales, is supposed to have been a Manaw Gododdin warlord who migrated southwest during the 5th century.

== Later history ==
In the 6th century, Bryneich was invaded by the Angles and became known as Bernicia. The Angles continued to press north. In around 600 the Gododdin raised a force of about 300 men to assault the Angle stronghold of Catraeth, perhaps Catterick, North Yorkshire. The battle, which ended disastrously for the Britons, was memorialised in the poem Y Gododdin.

In 638, Eidyn, modern Edinburgh, was under siege and fell to the Angles, for the Gododdin seem to have come under the rule of Bernicia around this time. To what extent the native population was replaced or assimilated is unknown. Bernicia became part of Northumbria.

== See also ==
- Mynyddawg Mwynfawr
