= Aneirin =

Medieval Welsh poet

- Occupation: Poet
- Notable work: Book of Aneirin, including Y Gododdin

Aneirin (Welsh pronunciation: [aˈnɛirɪn]), also rendered as Aneurin or Neirin and Aneurin Gwawdrydd, was an early Medieval Brythonic war poet who lived during the 6th century. He is believed to have been a bard or court poet in one of the Cumbric kingdoms of the Old North, probably that of Gododdin at Edinburgh, in modern Scotland. From the 17th century, he was usually known as Aneurin.

== Life ==
Some records indicate that Aneirin was the son of Caunus (or Caw) and brother to Gildas. According to this version of his life, he was born at Dumbarton on the River Clyde. However, some scholars debate this parentage, and contend that these records are of later invention and are erroneous. Whoever his father was, Aneirin's mother, Dwywei is mentioned in Y Gododdin. She may be the same lady who, according to Old Welsh pedigrees, married King Dunod who is generally thought to have ruled in the West Riding of Yorkshire.

== Reputation ==
The Welsh Triads describe Aneirin as "prince of bards" and "of flowing verse". Nennius praises him amongst the earliest Welsh poets or Cynfeirdd, a contemporary of Talhaearn, Taliesin, Bluchbardd and Cian. References to Aneirin are found in the work of the Poets of the Princes (Beirdd y Tywysogion), but his fame declined in the later Middle Ages until the re-assertion of Welsh identity by antiquarian writers of the Tudor period. Today, the reputation of his poetry remains high, though the exact identity of the author is more controversial.

== Poetry ==
The works attributed to Aneirin are preserved in a late 13th-century manuscript known as the Book of Aneirin (Welsh: Llyfr Aneirin). The language has been partially modernized into Middle Welsh, but other portions in Old Welsh indicate that at least some of the poetry dates from around Aneirin's time, and its attribution, therefore, may well be genuine. The work would have survived through oral transmission until first written down, perhaps in the 9th century.

Aneirin's best known work is Y Gododdin, a series of elegies for the warriors of the northern Brittonic kingdom of Gododdin who, in about 600, fell against the Angles of Deira and Bernicia at the Battle of Catraeth (probably Catterick, North Yorkshire). The poetry abounds in textual difficulties and consequently interpretations vary. One stanza contains what may possibly be the earliest reference to King Arthur, as a paragon of bravery with whom one fallen warrior is compared – the identification is, however, conjectural. The poem tells us that Aneirin was present at this battle and, having been taken prisoner, was one of only two or four Brittonic survivors; he remained a captive until his ransom was paid by Ceneu ap Llywarch Hen.
