= Ifor Williams =

Welsh scholar

Sir Ifor Williams FBA
- Sir Ifor photographed on 4 February 1965
- Born: 16 April 1881; Tregarth, Wales
- Died: 4 November 1965 (aged 84); Pontllyfni, Wales
- Occupations: Historian, Academic
- Spouse: Myfanwy Jones

Academic background
- Education: University College of North Wales

Sir Ifor Williams, FBA (16 April 1881 – 4 November 1965) was a Welsh scholar who laid the foundations for the academic study of Old Welsh, particularly early Welsh poetry.

== Early life and education ==
Ifor Williams was born at Pendinas, Tregarth near Bangor, Wales, the son of John Williams, a quarryman, and his wife Jane. His maternal grandfather, Hugh Derfel Hughes, was a noted local historian who wrote a well-regarded book on the history of the area. He went to Friars School, Bangor, in 1894 but had only been there for just over a year when he suffered a serious accident. This left him with back injuries that made him bedridden for several years.

Having recovered, he attended Clynnog School in 1901 and in 1902 won a scholarship to University College of North Wales. In 1905 he graduated with honours in Greek, then in 1906 in Welsh. He spent the 1906–07 academic year at the Department of Welsh working for his M.A. degree and assisting Sir John Morris-Jones, the Professor of Welsh, before being appointed an assistant lecturer. In 1920 a Chair of Welsh Literature was specially created for him, which he held until Sir John Morris-Jones died in 1929, when he became Professor of Welsh Language and Literature.

== Academic career ==
Ifor Williams had a lifelong interest in Welsh place-names, and was one of the first to apply rigorous academic methods to this field. He published Enwau Lleoedd ("Place Names") in 1945 which is still of great value today. Many of his early publications were written in order to provide teaching material and included versions with detailed notes of a number of old Welsh tales, notably the Mabinogi in 1930. He also produced scholarly editions of the works of a number of mediaeval poets such as Dafydd ap Gwilym and others in 1914 and Iolo Goch in 1925 with colleagues.

His main field of study however was Old Welsh and the earliest Welsh Poetry. He produced Canu Llywarch Hen in 1935 covering the poetry associated with Llywarch Hen, then in 1938 possibly his most important work, Canu Aneirin, the text with notes of the Gododdin attributed to the 6th-century poet Aneirin. For the first time the original text was distinguished from later additions and made comprehensible with notes, and this work has provided the foundation for all subsequent work on this poetry. He wrote an introduction to Canu Taliesin in 1960 on work of the poet Taliesin, with particular emphasis on the dating of the 6th century poems in the Taliesin corpus. The book followed his introduction with a new translation by J.E. Caerwyn Williams. Ifor Williams also published works on later Welsh poetry, such as the 10th century Armes Prydain.

Williams edited the Bulletin of the Board of Celtic Studies from 1937 to 1948. He was also a speaker on the radio, and selections of his radio lectures were published in three books.

== Personal history ==
Williams married Myfanwy Jones of Cae-glas, Pontllyfni, Arfon, in 1913, and there were two children, a daughter and a son. He retired in 1947 and was knighted the same year. In 1949 the University of Wales awarded him the honorary degree of LL.D. He lived from 1913 to 1947 in Menai Bridge and retired to Pontllyfni where he died in 1965. He is buried in the burial ground attached to Capel Brynaerau, Pontllyfni.
