= John T. Koch =

American historian and linguist (born 1953)

John T. Koch FLSW
- Born: 1952 (age 73–74)

Academic background
- Education: Harvard University

Academic work
- Discipline: Celtic studies
- Sub-discipline: Celtic languages; Early Celts; Old Irish; Old Welsh
- Institutions: Harvard University; Boston College; Centre for Advanced Welsh and Celtic Studies, University of Wales
- Notable ideas: Celtic from the West hypothesis

John Thomas Koch FLSW (born 1953) is an American academic, historian, and linguist who specializes in Celtic studies, especially prehistory, and the early Middle Ages. He is the editor of the five-volume Celtic Culture: A Historical Encyclopedia (2006, ABC Clio). He is perhaps best known as the leading proponent of the Celtic from the West hypothesis.

== Career ==
He is a graduate of Harvard University, where he was awarded the degrees of MA and PhD in Celtic Languages and Literatures in 1983 and 1985, respectively. He has also pursued studies at Jesus College, Oxford, and the University of Wales, Aberystwyth. He has taught Celtic Studies at Harvard University and Boston College.

Since 1998, he has been senior research fellow or reader at the Centre for Advanced Welsh and Celtic Studies, University of Wales, where he has supervised a research project called Celtic Languages and Cultural Identity, the output of which includes the five-volume Celtic Culture: A Historical Encyclopedia (2006), and An Atlas for Celtic Studies (2007).

He has published widely on aspects of early Irish and Welsh language, literature and history. His works include The Celtic Heroic Age (first published in 1994, 4th edition in 2003), in collaboration with John Carey; The Gododdin of Aneirin (1997), an edition, translation and discussion of the early Welsh poem Y Gododdin; and numerous articles published in books and journals. A grammar of Old Welsh and a book on the historical Taliesin are in the works.

In 2007, John Koch received a personal chair at the University of Wales.

In 2011, Koch was elected a Fellow of the Learned Society of Wales.

Koch supervises (as senior fellow and project leader) the Ancient Britain and the Atlantic Zone Project (covering Ireland, Armorica, and the Iberian Peninsula) at the University of Wales Centre for Advanced Welsh and Celtic Studies. In 2008, Koch gave the O'Donnell Lecture at Aberystwyth University titled People called Keltoi, the La Tène Style, and ancient Celtic languages: the threefold Celts in the light of geography. In 2009, Koch published a paper, later that year developed into a book, Tartessian: Celtic from the Southwest at the Dawn of History, detailing how the Tartessian language may have been the earliest directly attested Celtic language with the Tartessian written script used in the inscriptions based on a version of a Phoenician script in use around 825 BC. This was followed by Tartessian 2: Preliminaries to Historical Phonology in 2011, focused on the Mesas do Castelinho inscription.

== Ideas ==
Koch has been a leading proponent of the Celtic from the West hypothesis, the idea that the Celtic languages originated as a branch of the Indo-European languages not in the upper Danube valley, from where they radiated westward, but rather that they arose in a part of Atlantic Europe, including Southwestern Europe (Western France and Northern and Western Iberian Peninsula), as a combination of a language descendant from Proto-Indo-European and native Pre-Indo-European languages (related to Aquitanian, ancestor of Proto-Basque language, Iberian, and other unattested languages).

From there (in this scenario) they spread east to South Central Europe, including the Pannonian Basin, where early forms of the Proto-Italic already would have been developing independently from Proto-Indo-European. This language or languages also influenced early Pre-Proto-Germanic, the direct ancestor of Proto-Germanic, but not yet a fully Germanic proto-language, (possibly located in the southern coast of the Baltic Sea or other place of North Central Europe) and contributed to its rifting from the Balto-Slavic/Indo-Iranian dialect continuum (in the western Corded Ware Culture area).

This idea, the subject of three edited volumes in a series by Koch and Barry Cunliffe called Celtic from the West (2012–2016), is controversial.

== Published books ==
- Co-editor: Presenting counterpoints to the dominant terrestrial narrative of European prehistory. Maritime Encounters. Oxbow Books. 2025. ISBN 979-8-88857-184-2.
- Co-author: Bronze Age rock art in Iberia and Scandinavia: words, warriors, and long-distance metal trade. Oxbow Books. 2024. ISBN 979-8-88857-104-0.
- Celto-Germanic: Later Prehistory and Post-Proto-Indo-European vocabulary in the North and West (PDF). University of Wales Centre for Advanced Welsh and Celtic Studies. 2020. ISBN 978-1-907029-32-5.
- Common Ground and Progress on the Celtic of the South-western (SW) Inscriptions (PDF). University of Wales Centre for Advanced Welsh and Celtic Studies. 2019. ISBN 978-1-907029-26-4.
- Co-author: Exploring Celtic Origins: New ways forward in archaeology, linguistics, and genetics. Celtic Studies Publications series. Oxbow Books. 2019. ISBN 978-1-78925-088-6.
- Co-editor: Celtic from the West 3: Atlantic Europe in the Metal Ages ― Questions of Shared Language. Celtic Studies Publications series. Oxbow Books. 2016. ISBN 978-1-78570-227-3.
- Cunedda, Cynan, Cadwallon, Cynddylan: Four Welsh Poems and Britain 383–655. University of Wales Centre for Advanced Welsh and Celtic Studies. 2013. ISBN 978-1-907029-13-4.
- Co-editor: Celtic from the West 2: Rethinking the Bronze Age and the Arrival of Indo-European in Atlantic Europe. Celtic Studies Publications series. Oxbow Books. 2013. ISBN 978-1-84217-529-3.
- Tartessian: Celtic from the Southwest at the Dawn of History. Celtic Studies Publications series (2nd ed.). Oxbow Books. 2013 [2009]. ISBN 978-1-891271-17-5.
- Co-editor: Celtic from the West: Alternative Perspectives from Archaeology, Genetics, Language and Literature. Celtic Studies Publications series. Oxbow Books. 2012. ISBN 978-1-84217-475-3.
- Co-author: The Celts: History, Life, and Culture. ABC-CLIO. 2012. ISBN 978-1-59884-964-6 (2 vols.).
- Tartessian 2: The Inscription of Mesas do Castelinho – ro and the Verbal Complex – Preliminaries to Historical Phonology. Celtic Studies Publications series. Oxbow Books. 2011. ISBN 978-1-907029-07-3.
- An Atlas for Celtic Studies: Archaeology and Names in Ancient Europe and Early Medieval Ireland, Britain, and Brittany. Celtic Studies Publications series. Oxford: Oxbow Books. 2007. ISBN 978-1-84217-309-1.
- Editor Celtic Culture: A Historical Encyclopedia. Santa Barbara and Oxford: ABC-CLIO. 2006. ISBN 1-85109-440-7. E-book: ISBN 185-1094458 (4 vols.).
- Co-editor: The Celtic Heroic Age. Celtic Studies Publications series (4th ed.). Oxbow Books. 2003 [2002]. ISBN 978-1-891271-04-5. Additional volume: ISBN 978-1891271090 (2 vols.).
- Co-editor: The Inscriptions of Early Medieval Brittany – Les inscriptions de la Bretagne du Haut Moyen Âge. University of Aberystwyth. 2000.
- Co-editor: Ildanach Ildirech: A Festschrift for Proinsias Mac Cana. Celtic Studies Publications series. Oxbow Books. 1999. ISBN 978-1-891271-01-4.
- The Gododdin of Aneirin: Text and Context from Dark-Age North Britain. Celtic Studies Publications series. Oxbow Books. 1997. ISBN 978-0-7083-1374-9.
- Co-editor: Proceedings of the Harvard Celtic Colloquium Volume II. Harvard University. 1982.
