= Middle Welsh =

Celtic language of the High Middle Ages

- Kymraec
- Native to: Wales
- Era: Approached Modern Welsh by about the 15th century
- Language family: Indo-European: Celtic; Insular Celtic; Brittonic; Middle Welsh
- Early forms: Common Brittonic: Old Welsh
- Writing system: Latin

Language codes
- ISO 639-3: wlm
- Glottolog: midd1363

Middle Welsh (Welsh: Cymraeg Canol, Middle Welsh: Kymraec) is the label attached to the Welsh language of the 12th to 15th centuries, of which much more remains than for any earlier period. This form of Welsh developed directly from Old Welsh (Welsh: Hen Gymraeg).

== Literature and history ==
Middle Welsh is the language of a rich body of literature. Nearly all surviving early manuscripts of the Mabinogion are written in it, although the tales themselves are certainly much older. It is also the language of most of the manuscripts of mediaeval Welsh law. There are many translations and adaptations of chivalric romances (e.g. of the Grail and Charlemagne cycles), mostly from French. There are also a number of historical works translated from Latin, including a translation of Geoffrey of Monmouth's Historia Regum Britanniae, and Brut y Tywysogyon, a chronicle of Welsh history from the late 7th to the 13th (later to the 14th) century. A large number of religious works, such as lives of saints and theological tracts, based on Latin originals are preserved. There are also geographical and didactic works, proverbs, medical tracts, genealogies, grammars for the instruction of bards and lists of triads.

There is a sizable corpus of poetry in Middle Welsh. Some early poetry from a time preceding the Middle Welsh period is nevertheless preserved mostly in the linguistic form of that era: that includes Y Gododdin and the poems of Taliesin. From the Middle Welsh period itself, there are the works of the court poets (Gogynfeirdd) of 1100-1350, chiefly praise poems and commemorative poems, as well as a considerable number of religious ones. In the 14th century, a new style using primarily the cywydd metre developed, with its most notable representative being Dafydd ap Gwilym. The language of that period is sometimes described as early Modern Welsh, but poets writing until the early 15th century still used Middle Welsh forms and constructions.

Middle Welsh is reasonably intelligible, albeit with some work, to a modern-day Welsh speaker.

== Phonology ==
The phonology of Middle Welsh is quite similar to that of modern Welsh, with only a few differences. The letter u, which today represents /ɨ/ in North Western Welsh dialects and /i/ in South Welsh and North East Welsh dialects, represented the close central rounded vowel /ʉ/ in Middle Welsh. The diphthong aw is found in unstressed final syllables in Middle Welsh, while in Modern Welsh it has become o (e.g. Middle Welsh marchawc = Modern Welsh marchog "horseman"). Similarly, the Middle Welsh diphthongs ei and eu have become ai and au in final syllables, e. g. Middle Welsh seith = modern saith "seven", Middle Welsh heul = modern haul "sun".

The vowels are as follows:

	Front	Central		Back
	Front	Unrounded	Rounded	Back
Close	i	ɨ	ʉ	u
Mid	e	ə		o
Open		a		

Vowel length is predictable: vowels are long in monosyllables unless followed by a geminate or one of the consonants /p/, /t/, /k/, /m/, /ŋ/. The vowels could combine into the following falling diphthongs:

1. ending in /w/: /aw/, /ew/, /iw/, /ɨw/ ~ /əw/

2. ending in /ɨ/: /aɨ/, /oɨ/, /uɨ/

3. others: /ej/, /eʉ/ (and possibly /æj/, /æʉ/)

The diphthongs /æj/ and /æʉ/, whose first component gradually changed into /a/, were originally allophones of /ej/ and /eʉ/, respectively, and no distinction between the two was expressed in Middle Welsh spelling, so their presence during most of Middle Welsh is not immediately observable. However, the fact that the modern pronunciations beginning with an /a/ occur in all word-final syllables, regardless of stress, makes it plausible that their distinctness from /ej/ and /eʉ/ was a legacy from the time before the stress shifted from final to penultimate syllables in Old Welsh. The full opening to /aj/ and /aʉ/ may have been completed at some point in later Middle Welsh, possibly the thirteenth to fourteenth centuries.

The consonants are as follows:

	Labial		Dental		Alveolar		Lateral		Palatal	Velar		Glottal
Nasal	m̥ʰ	m			n̥ʰ	n				ŋ̊ʰ	ŋ	
Stop	p	b			t	d				k	ɡ	
Fricative	ɸ	β	θ	ð	s		ɬ		ʃ	x		h
Trill					r̥ʰ	r						
Approximant								l	j		w	

Consonants may be geminate. /ʃ/ is mostly found in loanwords such as siacet 'jacket'.

Stress was placed on the penultimate syllable with some exceptions such as the causative verbs in -háu, e.g. sicrháu ('to make things secure' from sicr 'secure'). In terms of intonation, the tonal peak must have been aligned with the post-stress syllable, reflecting the earlier final stress of the late Brythonic period, since this persists even in Modern Welsh.

== Orthography ==
=== Differences from modern Welsh ===
The orthography of Middle Welsh was not standardised, and there is great variation between manuscripts in how certain sounds are spelled. Some generalisations of differences between Middle Welsh spelling and Modern Welsh spelling can be made. For example, the possessive adjectives ei "his, her", eu "their" and the preposition i "to" are very commonly spelled y in Middle Welsh, and are thus spelled the same as the definite article y and the indirect relative particle y. A phrase such as y gath is therefore ambiguous in Middle Welsh between the meaning "the cat" (spelled the same in Modern Welsh), the meaning "his cat" (modern ei gath), and the meaning "to a cat" (modern i gath). The voiced stop consonants /d ɡ/ are represented by the letters t c at the end of a word, e.g. diffryt "protection" (modern diffryd), redec "running" (modern rhedeg). The sound /k/ is very often spelled k before the vowels e i y (in Modern Welsh, it is always spelled with a c, e.g. Middle Welsh keivyn = modern ceifn "third cousin"). The sound /β/ is usually spelled with a u or v (these are interchangeable as in Latin MSS), except at the end of a word, where it is spelled with an f (in Modern Welsh, it is always spelled with a f, e.g. Middle Welsh auall = modern afal "apple tree"). The sound /ð/ is usually spelled with a d (in Modern Welsh, it is spelled with a dd, e.g. Middle Welsh dyd = modern dydd "day"). The sound /r̥/ is spelled r and is thus not distinguished from /r/ (in Modern Welsh, they are distinguished as rh and r respectively, e.g. Middle Welsh redec "running" vs. modern rhedeg). The epenthetic vowel /ə/ is usually written, in contrast to Modern Welsh: e.g. mwnwgyl rather than mwnwgl "neck".

=== Letter-sound correspondences ===
In general, the spelling is both variable and historical and does not reflect some sound changes that had taken place by the Middle Welsh period, most notably the lenition. Some of the less predictable letter-sound correspondences are the following:

grapheme	phoneme
⟨ae⟩ (⟨ay⟩)	/aɨ/
⟨oe⟩ (⟨oy⟩)	/oɨ/
⟨u⟩	/ʉ/ /β/ /w/
⟨w⟩	/u/ (hence ⟨wy⟩ for /uɨ/) /w/ (hence ⟨wy⟩ for /wɨ/)
⟨y⟩	/ɨ/ (word-finally) /ə/ (elsewhere, reflecting mutation – see below) /j/ (between consonants and vowels) /i/ (occasionally; in the 3rd person possessive y and the negative particle ny)
⟨e⟩	/e/ /ɨ/ (only word-finally; especially in early texts) /ə/ (non-word-finally; especially in early texts)
⟨ei⟩	possibly /æj/ (word-finally) /ej/ (elsewhere)
⟨eu⟩, ⟨ev⟩	possibly /æʉ/ (word-finally) /eʉ/ (elsewhere)
⟨mh⟩	/m̥/
⟨nh⟩	/n̥/
⟨ngh⟩, ⟨gh⟩	/ŋ̊/
⟨f⟩	/ɸ/ /β/ (medially and word-finally)
⟨ff⟩ (mostly medially and finally)	/ɸ/
⟨th⟩	/θ/ (rarely /ð/)
⟨ch⟩	/x/
⟨ll⟩ or ⟨ỻ⟩	/ɬ/
⟨r⟩	/r/ /r̥/
⟨v⟩ or ⟨ỽ⟩	/β/
⟨d⟩	/ð/ /d/
⟨b⟩	/b/
⟨g⟩	/ɡ/ /ŋ/ (occasionally)
⟨p⟩	/p/ /b/ (postvocalically)
⟨t⟩	/t/ /d/ (postvocalically)
⟨k⟩ (before front vowels)	/k/
⟨c⟩ (before back vowels and word-finally)	/k/ /ɡ/ (postvocalically)
⟨si⟩ (before other vowels, rare)	/ʃ/

== Grammar ==
=== Morphology ===
==== Notable differences from modern Welsh ====
Middle Welsh is closer to the other medieval Celtic languages, e.g. Old Irish, in its morphology. For example, the endings -wŷs, -ws, -es and -as are used for 3rd person singular of the preterite in Middle Welsh as well as the form -odd. In the same person and tense exists the old reduplicated preterite kigleu 'he heard' of the verb klywet 'to hear', which corresponds to the Old Irish ·cúalae '(s)he heard' from the verb ro·cluinethar '(s)he hears'.

Middle Welsh also retains more plural forms of adjectives that do not appear in modern Welsh, e.g. cochion, plural of coch 'red'.

The nominal plural ending -awr is very common in Middle Welsh, but has been replaced in modern Welsh by -au.

==== Morphonology ====
Like modern Welsh, Middle Welsh exhibits in its morphology numerous vowel alternations as well as the typical Insular Celtic initial consonant mutations.

===== Vowels =====
There is a productive alternation between final syllables and non-final syllables known as mutation or centring, which is by necessity triggered by the addition of any suffix and operates as follows:

Centring mutation
final	non-final	example
w	y /ə/	bwrd 'board' – pl. byrdeu dwg 's/he leads' – dygaf 'I lead'
y /ɨ/	y /ə/	cledyf 'sword' – pl. cledyfeu
aw	o	brawt 'brother' – pl. broder hawl 's/he claims' – holaf 'I claim' marchawg 'horseman' – marchoges 'horsewoman'

The centring mutation is due to a process of vowel reduction that operated earlier, in late Brythonic, when the stress was placed on the last syllable.

Further, there are two types of alternations that are caused by following vowels (extant or lost) and are no longer entirely productive, but nonetheless very frequent in the morphology. The first type is ultimate affection, which occurs in the last syllable of a word and is caused by a vowel that used to be located in the next syllable. The originally triggering vowel is either i or a, hence the alternations are referred to as i-affection and a-affection. The more common type is i-affection, which occurs in plurals with a zero ending and in the present singular of many verbs. In addition, in some cases, the singular has an affected vowel, but the plural does not (this has been termed 'reversion'). The alternation operates as follows:

Ultimate i-affection
non-mutated	mutated	example
a, ae	ei	bard 'bard' – pl. beird maen 'stone' – pl. mein safaf 'I stand' – seif 's/he stands' dragon 'dracons' – dreic 'dracon' Saeson 'Saxons' – Seis 'Saxon'
e, o, w	y	gwelaf 'I see' – gwyl 's/he sees' corn 'horn' – pl. cyrn gwr 'man' – pl. gwyr
oe	wy	oen 'lamb' – pl. wyn

Ultimate a-affection is found, most notably, in the feminine forms of adjectives that do have gender declension, and it changes the stem vowels as follows:

Ultimate a-affection
non-mutated	mutated	example
y	e	gwynn (masc.) – gwenn (fem.) 'white'
w	o	crwm (masc.) – crom (fem.) 'bent'

The second type of affection is triggered by (typically) extant close vowels or semivowels in the following syllables, and is hence known as penultimate affection (in fact, it also reaches the antepenult in Middle Welsh). The effect varies somewhat depending on the triggering vowel, hence one may speak more specifically, for instance, of y-affection. Penultimate y-affection is a regular feature of verb forms with an ending containing y (e.g. the second person singular and plural in the present indicative). Both it and other types of penultimate affection may also occur due to the addition of suffixes containing the respective vowels, e.g. in the plural of nouns.

Penultimate affections
non-mutated	trigger	mutated	example
a	y, i (/i/)	e	caraf 'I love' – kery 'thou lovest' dar 'oak' – pl. deri cawr 'giant' – pl. kewri
a, e	i (/j/)	ei	mab 'son' – pl. meibyon
ae	i (/i/ or /j/)	ei	maer 'steward' – pl. meiri
ae	y	ey	caer 'fort' – pl. keyryd

Penultimate and ultimate affection may occur in one and the same form, e.g. castell 'castle' – pl. kestyll, manach 'monk' – meneich 'monks', or, with reversion, elein 'fawn' – pl. alaned (the latter two may then be termed cases of 'ei-affection').

===== Consonants =====
In contrast to modern Welsh, the consonant mutations are not always reflected in Middle Welsh orthography; this is especially true of the nasal mutation.

1. Lenition / soft mutation

Lenition turns voiceless stop consonants into voiced ones and voiced stops into fricatives (further turning into zero in the case of /ɣ/).

Lenition / soft mutation
non-mutated	mutated
p	b
t	d
c	g
b	f, v, u /β/
d /d/	d /ð/
g	∅
m	f, v, u /β/
ll	l
r /r̥/	r /r/

It occurs most notably:

a. in the second members of compounds: march 'horse' > moruarch 'sea-horse, whale';

b. in a noun preceded by the possessive pronouns for 3rd singular masculine and 2nd singular possessors (y 'his' and dy/th 'thy'): kyuoeth 'wealth, realm' > y gyuoeth 'his wealth, realm';

c. in a noun preceded by the numerals 1, 2 and 7: march 'horse' > deu uarch 'two horses';

d. in a noun or adjective preceded by a name that it describes: brenhin 'king' > Keredic Vrenhin 'Ceredig the king'; bendigeit 'blessed' > Catwaladyr Uendigeit 'Cadwaladr the blessed';

e. in a possessor noun or an adjective preceded by a feminine singular noun or a semantically dual noun: Morgant > gulat Uorgant 'the land of Morgan', tec 'fair' > y wreic deccaf 'the fairest lady', mawr 'big' > deu uarch uawr 'two big horses';

f. in a feminine singular noun preceded by the definite article: gwreig > y wreig 'the woman';

g. in a noun following the prepositions a, am, ar, at, dan, gan, heb, hyt, y, is, o, tros, trwy, uch, wrth, the conjunction neu or the vocative particle a;

h. in a noun functioning as the subject after some verbal forms (in contrast to modern Welsh). It is common after many 3rd person forms of the verb 'to be', and after the 3rd person singular imperfect and pluperfect (sometimes also preterite) of other verbs. It also occurs in subjects separated from their verbs;

i. in a noun functioning as the object after most verbal forms, but sometimes not after the 3rd singular present and preterite;

j. in a noun or adjective functioning as a nominal predicate after the verb 'to be' or the predicative particles yn and y: mawr 'big' > ot oed uawr ef 'if he was big';

k. in a noun or adjective used adverbially (including after the adverbial particle yn);

l. in a verb after the relative pronoun a, the interrogative pronouns pa, py and cwt, the interrogative particle a, the negative particles ny and na, the affirmative particles neu, ry and a, the particle yt, many prefixes such as go- and di-, the conjunctions pan, tra and yny;

m. in the verb 'to be' after a nominal predicate.

2. Nasal mutation

The nasal mutation replaces stops with corresponding nasals (while keeping them voiceless if the original stops were voiceless):

Nasal mutation
non-mutated	mutated
p	mh
t	nh
c	ngh
b	m
d /d/	n
g	ng

It occurs:

a. after the preposition yn 'in' (and sometimes also the predicative and adverbial particle yn): pob 'every' > ymhob 'in every'. This does not occur with verbal nouns.

b. the possessive pronoun vy 'my': brawt 'brother' > vy mrawt 'my brother'

c. the numerals 7, 9, 19, 12, 15, 100, and by extension some others.

3. Spirant mutation

The spirant mutation replaced voiceless stops with fricatives:

Spirant mutation
non-mutated	mutated
p	ph
t	th
c	ch

It occurs after:

a. the possessive pronoun for 3rd singular feminine possessors y 'her': penn 'head' > y phenn 'her head'

b. the conjunction/preposition a 'and, with', the conjunctions no 'than', na 'neither, nor' and o 'if', the preposition and adverb tra 'over, very'.

c. the negative particles ny, na (note that these also cause the spirant mutation), the affirmative particles neu and ry, many prefixes such as go- and di- (note that these also cause lenition of the other mutable consonants)

d. the numerals 3 and 6.

e. the interrogative cw 'where?'

4. Aspiration (sandhi h)

The consonant h appears initially before vowels after certain pronouns, namely the possessive pronouns y 'her', yn/an 'our', eu/y(w) 'their' and the 1st singular 'infixed' pronoun -m as well as the 'infixed' pronoun -e/y when it expresses a 3rd person object (be it singular masculine, singular feminine, or plural); e.g. wynneb 'face' > y hwynneb 'her face'.

5. Provection

Provection is a phenomenon that causes devoicing of consonants within certain medial consonant clusters that may arise via morphological processes. Two identical voiced stops yield a voiceless geminate stop (e.g. d + d > tt), a voiced stop is devoiced before another voiced stop or voiceless consonant (d + b > tb or tp), a voiced consonant may be devoiced before a sonorant (d + r > tr) and is always devoiced before a voiceless consonant (d + s > ts) and merges with a following /h/ into a voiceless geminate (e.g. d + h > tt).

==== Nouns ====
There are two genders, masculine and feminine.

There is a definite article which precedes the noun phrase and has the form y- before a consonant and yr- before a vowel or /h/.

Noun plurals may end in a variety of unpredictable endings such as -eu, -(i)on, -oed, -ed, -yd, -et, -ot, -(i)eit, -awt, -awr, -ant, -er, -yr, -i or zero suffix with ultimate i affection in the root). A vowel change may also accompany the addition of an ending; apart from the predictable option of centring, that vowel change may also be a penultimate i, y or j affection (before -ion, -ieit, -i, -yd or rarely -ieu) or, conversely, a reversion of ultimate i affection before endings such as -eu, -on, -ed and -ot. The special plural suffix -os has diminutive meaning. There are also singulative endings -yn (masculine) and -en (feminine), which produce singulars not only from collectives, but also from plurals: blew 'hair' > blewyn 'a hair'; llyc 'mouse' > llygot 'mice' > llygoden 'mouse'.

There is no grammatical case. Nouns may be placed after another nouns to express a possessor, sometimes triggering a mutation, for which see above.

==== Adjectives ====
Some, but not all adjectives may have special plural and feminine forms, and concord is not always observed. The plurals may be formed with a zero ending and ultimate i-affection or with the ending -(y)on /-(j)on/, which may also cause mutation or penultimate j-affection. The adjective-forming suffixes -adwy, -eit, -in, -lyt never allow plural formation. Feminine forms of adjectives are derived from masculine ones via ultimate a-affection.

The equative degree is formed by the suffix -(h)et, the preposed particle mor or the prefix ky(f)-. The forms in -(h)et are preceded by ky(n). E.g. ky uelynet oed a'r eur 'it was as yellow as gold'. The comparative is formed with the suffix -ach (the comparandum is introduced by the aspirating conjunction no(c) 'than') and the superlative uses the suffix -(h)af (the comparandum is introduced with the preposition o 'of').

Adjectives could be used adverbially when preceded by the particle y(n) (kilyaw y gyflym 'withdrew hurriedly'); when they were placed first in the sentence or were in the comparative, they did not require the particle either.

==== Pronouns ====
The personal pronouns have many forms with different functions. The independent forms are commonly used as objects, syntactically isolated or as fronted subjects. The reduplicated forms express emphasis, the 'conjunctive' ones express contrast, and the 'infixed' ones usually express objects or possessors, while being added to various particles and function words. The prepositional forms are added to prepositions ('conjugating' them). The forms as follows:

Pronouns
	Simple	Reduplicated	Conjunctive	Infixed	Possessive unstressed	Possessive stressed	Prepositional
1st sing.	(m)i	miví	(m)inheu	-'m (aspirating)	vy(n)	meu	-f
2nd sing.	ti/di	tidí	titheu/ditheu	-th	dy	teu	-t
3rd sing masc.	ef	efó	ynteu	-y/e/s (aspirating as object)	y (leniting)	eidaw	-(dd/th)aw
3rd sing. fem.	hi	hihí	hitheu	-y/e (aspirating)	y (aspirating)	eidi	-ei/(dd/th)i
1st pl.	ni	niní	ninheu	-n (aspirating as possessive)	yn, an (aspirating)	einym	-m
2nd pl.	chwi	chwichwí	chwitheu	-ch	ych, ach	einwch	-wch
3rd pl.	wy(nt)	wyntwy	wynteu	-y/e/s (aspirating)	eu, y(w)(aspirating)	eidu	-(dd/th)unt

The variants i and di of the 1st and 2nd singular simple pronouns and inneu and ditheu of the corresponding conjunctive pronouns are used when these follow a conjugated verb, preposition or possessed noun; Evans (1970) terms them 'affixed' pronouns.

In the 3rd singular infixed pronoun, the allomorph -i/e is used after the words a, y, pan, tra and yny, while -s is used after ny, na, ry, neu, can, gwedy, kyt, o and pei.

The reflexive pronoun consists of the word hun (pl. hunein), preceded by a possessive pronoun (as in myself, yourself etc.).

The most common relative pronoun is a.

The demonstrative pronouns may be proximal or distal and distinguish, besides the masculine and the feminine form, a neuter one, which, however, corresponds with the plural. They are as follows:

Demonstrative pronouns
	sing.masc.	sing.fem.	neuter and plural
proximal	hwnn	honn	hynn
distal	hwnnw	honno	hynny

Some demonstrative adverbs are ynaeth 'then', yno 'there' (yna can mean both), ynoeth 'thither', yma(n) 'here', (y)velly 'so, thus'. Now was nw in early texts, but later weithon, i.e. y weith hon (lit. 'this time') or yn awr (lit. 'in/the hour').

Sawl is 'so many'. Meint 'number, size', ryw 'kind' and peth 'thing' can be used in various complex constructions with pronominal elements.

The main interrogative pronouns are pwy 'who' and pa/py 'which'. 'What' can be expressed as pa beth 'which thing?'. Others are pet 'how many', cwt 'where', pan 'whence', pi 'whose' (always merged with a copula – pieu = pi+yw, pioed = pi+oed etc.).

Universal pronouns are pawp, oll 'all' (with adjectival variants pop and holl) and cwbyl 'the whole'.

Indefinite pronouns are nep 'any(one)' and dim 'any(thing)'.

==== Verbs ====
===== Finite forms =====
There are four tenses – present(-future), preterite, imperfect and pluperfect – and two moods (indicative and subjunctive). A subjunctive is distinguished from the indicative only in the present and the imperfect. The verb agrees with the subject (but it agrees in number only if the subject is placed before the verb, not after it). The inflection of the verb distinguishes two numbers and three persons, as well as a special 'impersonal' form, which is used in a way similar to a passive.

Present indicative
	caru, "to love"	bot, "to be"
I	caraf	wyf
Thou	kery	wyt
He, she, it	car	yw, (y) mae, ((y) taw), oes
We	carwn	ym
You (pl.)	kerych	ywch
They	carant	ynt, maent
Impersonal	kerir	ys, yssit

Contrary to the example of caru, the 3rd singular present of many or most verbs has i-affection, e.g. arch-af 'I ask', but eirch 'he asks'. Furthermore, some verbs, especially denominatives, have a 3rd singular ending -(h)a (originally part of a suffix). Some other, rare and archaic 3rd singular endings still occurring in Middle Welsh are -(h)it, -(h)awt, -yt, -yd. Of the different forms of the 3rd person of bot, yw, ynt follow the predicate, whereas (y) mae, (y) maent are placed in the beginning of the clause (and can alone mean 'where?' in questions); oes is used in negations, questions and conditions, mostly in the sense 'there is' ('there is' is also the meaning of the impersonal yssit; ys is used mostly with verbal nouns and in the mixed order, for which see the section Syntax).

Imperfect indicative
	caru, "to love"	bot, "to be"
I	carwn	oedwn
Thou	carut	oedut
He, she, it	carei	oed
We	carem	oedem
You (pl.)	carewch	oedewch
They	kerynt	oedynt
Impersonal	kerit	oedit

The 3rd singular ending may also be -i with penultimate i-affection.

Preterite indicative
	caru, "to love"	bot, "to be"
I	kereis	buum
Thou	kereist	buost
He, she, it	carawd	bu
We	carassom	buam/buom
You (pl.)	carassauch	buawch
They	carassant	buant/buont
Impersonal	carwyt	buwyt

Contrary to the example of caru, and unlike modern Welsh, the 3rd person singular preterite form most frequently ends in -wys or -ws, or in -s preceded by some other vowel as in -as, -es or -is, e.g. gallws 'was able'.

Pluperfect indicative
	caru, "to love"	bot, "to be"
I	carasswn	buasswn
Thou	carassut	buassut
He, she, it	carassei	buassei
We	carassem	
You (pl.)	carassewch	
They	carassynt	buassynt
Impersonal	carassit	

Present subjunctive
	caru, "to love"	bot, "to be"
I	car(h)wyf	bwyf (bof)
Thou	ker(h)ych	bych (bwyr)
He, she, it	car(h)o	bo (boet)
We	car(h)om	bom
You (pl.)	car(h)och	boch
They	car(h)ont	bont
Impersonal	car(h)er	byther

The second person singular exhibits y-affection.

Imperfect subjunctive
	caru, "to love"	bot, "to be"
I	car(h)wn	bewn
Thou	car(h)ut	beut
He, she, it	car(h)ei	bei
We	car(h)em	beym
You (pl.)	car(h)ewch	
They	ker(h)ynt	beynt
Impersonal	ker(h)it	bythit

The /h/ of the subjunctives is in the process of disappearing after vowels and sonorants, but causes provection (devoicing and gemination) after voiced consonants: e.g. dycko corresponding to 1st person singular indicative dygaf 'bring'. The subjunctive is used to express wishes, indefiniteness, purpose or a concession.

Imperative
	caru, "to love"	bot, "to be"
I		
Thou	car	byd
He, she, it	caret	bit/boet
We	carwn	bydwn
You (pl.)	kerwch	bydwch
They	carent	bwynt

The 3rd singular may also end in -(h)it.

Note: Bot also has special 'consuetudinal' (habitual) forms for the present and past mostly formed from the stem byd-.

===== Non-finite forms =====
Non-finite forms
	caru, "to love"
verbal noun	caru
verbal adjective I (past passive participle)	caredic
verbal adjective II (future passive participle)	caradwy

Both of the verbal adjectives have passive meaning: the one in -edic is a past participle passive (car-edic 'loved') and the one in -adwy is a future participle passive or gerundive (cred-adwy 'credible'). Less common suffixes with a past passive meaning are -at, -(h)awt and -eit.

The verbal noun is formed in a great variety of ways, the most common ones being:

1. just the verb stem with a zero suffix: adaw 'leave'

2. with the suffix -u, which is typical of stems containing -a-, -ae-, -e- and -y-: caru 'love', credu 'believe', kyrchy 'approach', including denominative stems in -ych-: bredychu 'betray'

3. with the suffix -aw, which is typical of stems ending in -i or containing -i-, -u-, -wy- or -eu- (keissyaw 'seek', gwisgaw 'dress', urdaw 'ordain', kwynaw 'complain', blodeuaw 'blossom')

4. with the suffix -i, which is typical of stems containing -o-/-oe- or ending in -w (adoli 'worship', merwi 'die'); there are also some stems containing -a-, which then undergo penultimate i-affection: erchi 'request'.

There are also some less common suffixes such as -ach, -aeth, -(a)el, -ec, -(e/y/u/i/ei)t, -n, -wyn, -(ou)ein, -fa(n) and -s.

Verbal nouns are used very frequently in many periphrastic constructions, including prepositional phrases (with the preposition y – lit. 'towards V-ing', i.e. 'in order to V', with the preposition yn – lit. 'in (the process of) V-ing'), as an object of the verb gwneithur 'do' (lit. 'to do a V-ing'). They may even occur alone without a finite verb within a narrative (lit. 'And (there was) a V-ing'). The subject could be introduced by o 'from'.

==== Prepositions ====
Prepositions are 'conjugated', i.e. pronominal morphemes are added to the prepositions. The preposition may also undergo other changes, e.g.:

Preposition allomorphs
independent form	pronominal form	meaning
am	amdan-	'about'
ar	arn-	'on'
at	att-	'to'
o	oha/on-	'from', 'of'
rwng /r̥uŋ/	ro-, 3rd pers. ryd-	'between'
yn	ynd- /ənð-/	'in'

A vowel appears before the preposition; it may be -a-, -o- or -y-, depending on the specific preposition, e.g. ar 'on' – arn-a-f 'on me', rac (/r̥aɡ/) 'before' – rag-of 'before me', gan 'from' – genhyf 'from me'.

Pronominal conjugations
	'on'	'before'	'with'	'to'
basic form	ar	rac	gan	y
'me'	arnaf	ragof	genhyf	ymi
'thee'	arnat	ragot	genhyt	ytti
'him'	arnaw	racdaw	ganthaw	itaut
'her'	arnei	racdei	genthi	idi
'us'	arnam	ragom	genhym	ynni
'you' (pl.)	arnawch	ragoch	genhwch	ywch
'them'	arnadut, arnunt	racdut, racdunt	gantut, gantunt	udu(t), udunt

Most prepositions cause lenition (am, ar, gan etc.), but yn 'in' causes nasal mutation and a(c) 'with' causes spirant mutation. The prepositions themselves often occur with a lenited or non-lenited first consonant. Some notable prepositions are a(c) 'with', am 'around', amcan y 'about', ar 'on', at 'to', can(t) 'with, by', ker 'near, by', ech 'out of', eithyr 'outside', erbyn 'by, for, against', gwedy 'after', heb 'without', herwyd 'according to', gerfyd 'by', hyt 'until', is 'below', mal 'like', o(c) 'from', parth 'towards', rac (/r̥aɡ/) 'for', (y) rwng (/r̥uŋ/) 'between', tan 'under' y 'to, for', tra(c) 'over, beyond', tros 'for, instead of', trwy 'through', y ('to', 'for', 'belonging to'), (y) tu (a(c)) 'towards', uch 'above', wrth 'at, by, for', y(n) 'in' (y before infixed pronouns), yr 'during, for'. Prepositional phrases often function as complex prepositions: ym penn 'at the end of' (from penn 'head, end'). As indicated elsewhere, y(n) may also introduce nominal predicates and words used adverbially.

=== Syntax ===
As in modern written Welsh, the VSO word order (Gwelod y brenin gastell: "Saw the king a castle") is not used exclusively in Middle Welsh, but irregular and mixed orders are also used: Y brenin a uelod gastell: ("[It was] the king that saw a castle"). The suggestion is that the mixed order places emphasis on the subject, and is often used in Welsh today to emphasise something. The formal difference between the two is that a negative particle (ny/na) precedes the subject in the mixed order (thus Ny brenin a uelod gastell would mean "It was not the king that saw the castle", but precedes the verb in the irregular order (thus Brenin ny uelod gastell = "The king did not see a castle"). Furthermore, the mixed order could preserve the copula that originally participated in this cleft construction (Ys y brenin a uelod gastell).

Unlike modern Welsh, however, the irregular or 'abnormal' orders are much more common than the 'normal' one, even though they require an additional particle to be grammatical. There are two main variations:

1. with a subject or object 'fronted' before the verb (SVO or OVS) and followed by the particle a (causing lenition) – e.g. Arawn a eirch y wrogaeth instead of Eirch Arawn y wrogaeth 'Arawn asks for his homage';

2. with an adverbial expression 'fronted' before the verb (AdvV) and followed by the particle y(d) (yd before a vowel; causing lenition) – e.g. Y Lynn Cuch y uynn hela instead of mynn ef hela y Lynn Cuch 'he wanted to hunt in Glynn Cuch'.

Both particles may also be replaced by ry or yr.

When the verb of a sentence is a copula governing a nominal predicate (P), early texts preferred the order VPS, but PVS becomes more common in the bulk of Middle Welsh prose. If the nominal predicate is not fronted, it may be introduced by the particle y(n): y bu (yn) barawt ('it's ready').

A direct question is introduced by a: A dywedy di ynni? 'Will you tell us?'

Modifiers, both adjectives and 'genitives', normally follow their nouns, e.g. gwreic dec 'a fair woman', pendeuic Dyuet 'the prince of Dyfed' (with lenition if the nouns are feminine). The nouns indicating a possessor (the 'genitive nouns') are, morphologically, just unmarked nouns juxtaposed with another noun (apart from the lenition after a feminine noun). Independent pronouns can be appended in the same way, redundantly, after a noun already modified by a possessive pronoun (y erchwys ef, lit. 'his dogs (of) him') and likewise after a 'conjugated preposition' (arnaf i, lit. 'on-me me'). An adjective may precede a noun if connected with it by the particle a 'which' (maur a teith 'a long journey') and a few adjectives such as hen 'old' and prif 'chief' are also normally placed in front of the noun.

Possession is expressed literally as '(possessed) is with (possessor)', rather than with a verb 'to have'.

=== Numerals ===
Only the cardinal numerals for 2 to 4 and the ordinal numerals for 3 to 4 have a gender distinction. The ordinal numerals are mostly formed with the suffix -uet, less commonly -et or -yd (masculine) / -ed (feminine), while '1st' and '2nd' are suppletively formed. The morphologically simple cardinal numerals and their corresponding ordinal numerals are as follows:

Simple numerals
	cardinal		ordinal	
	masc.	fem.	masc.	fem.
1	un		kyntaf	
2	deu	dwy	eil	
3	tri	teir	trydy(d)	tryde(d)
4	pedwar	pedeir	pedwyryd	pedwyred
5	pym(p), pum(p)		pymhet	
6	chwe(ch)		chwechet	
7	seith		seithuet	
8	wyth, oeth		wythuet	
9	naw		nawuet	
10	dec		decuet	
20	ugeint		ugeinuet	
100	can(t)		canuet	
1000	mil		NA	

The numerals from 11 to 19 are formed in a variety of ways. 12 and 15 simply conjoin a simple numeral with the word 'ten'; 11, 13, 14 are literally 'N on ten'; 16, 17, 18, 19 are 'N on fifteen', and 18 is 'two nines'. The original pattern was that of 12 and 15, and some early texts contain words for 11, 14 and 19 that follow the same pattern. The ordinals apply the ordinal form sometimes of the unit and sometimes with the word ten.

Teens
	numeral	literally	ordinal
11	un ar dec	'one on ten'	unuet ar dec (undecuet)
12	deudec	'two-ten'	deudecuet
13	tri/teir ar dec	'three on ten'	trydydec
14	pedwar/pedeir ar dec	'four on ten'	
15	pymthec	'five-ten'	
16	un ar bymthec	'one on fifteen'	
17	deu/dwy ar bymthec	'two on fifteen'	
18	tri/teir ar bymthec	'three on fifteen'	
19	pedwar/pedeir ar bymthec	'four on fifteen'	

Between 20 and 40, numbers are expressed as 'N on twenty'. The numbers from 40 to 180 are expressed using a vigesimal system, with multiples of 20 ('N twenties'), and, if necessary, units exceeding the nearest multiple designated as 'N and N twenties' (or, sometimes, as 'N twenties and N').

Tens
	numeral	literally
21	un ar hugein(t)	'one on twenty'
30	dec ar hugein(t)	'ten on twenty'
35	pymthec ar hugein(t)	'fifteen on twenty'
40	deu ugein(t), deugein(t)	'two twenties'
41	un a deu ugein(t), (deu ugein(t) a un)	'one and two twenties', ('two twenties and one')
50	dec a deugein(t)	'ten and two twenties'
60	tri ugein(t), trugein(t)	'three twenties'
80	pedwar ugein(t)	'four twenties'
90	dec a phedwar ugein(t)	'ten and four twenties'
120	chwe ugein(t)	'six twenties'
140	seith ugein(t)	'seven twenties'
160	wyth ugein(t)	'eight twenties'
180	naw ugein(t)	'nine twenties'

Hundreds and thousands are denoted by conjoining the unit they are multiples of with the words for 'hundred' and thousand. Exceeding units are indicated added to the hundred or the thousand using the word 'a(c)' 'and': 'N and N hundred' (or 'N hundred and N').

Hundreds and thousands
	numeral	literally
200	deucant	'two-hundred'
300	trychant	'three-hundred'
2000	dwy vil	'two thousand'
101	cant ac un / un a chant	'a hundred and one' 'one and a hundred'

In accordance with this, the number 6,666 is expressed as chue guyr a thri ugeint a chuechant a chue mil, i.e. 'six men and three twenties and six hundred and six thousand'. Both cardinal and ordinal numerals generally precede the nouns that they modify (except for kyntaf 'first'); the noun after a cardinal may be in the singular, as in deu wr 'two men', or in the plural. If the numeral is composite, the noun comes after the first element: teir llong ar dec 'three ships on ten', i.e. '13 ships'. The phrases with a cardinal can also be constructed as 'N of Xs', e.g. tri o wyr 'three men', and this is the normal pattern with thousands (pym mil o wyr '5000 men'). Sometimes, compounds are formed: cannwr 'a hundred men'.

== Sample text ==
	Medieval spelling	Modernised spelling	Literal translation
1.	Pwyll Pendeuic Dyuet a oed yn arglwyd ar seith cantref Dyuet.	Pwyll Pendefig Dyfed a oedd yn arglwydd ar seith cantref Dyfed.	Pwyll Prince of Dyved was lord over the seven Cantrevs (regions) of Dyved.
2.	A threigylgweith yd oed yn Arberth, prif lys idaw.	A threiglweith ydd oedd yn Arberth, prif lys iddaw.	And once upon a time he was at Narberth, a chief palace belonging to him.
3.	A dyuot yn y uryt ac yn y uedwl uynet y hela.	A dyfod yn ei fryd ac yn ei feddwl fyned i hela.	And 'it came to his face and into his thought' (i.e. he wanted) to go to hunt.
4.	Sef kyueir o'y gyuoeth a uynnei y hela, Glynn Cuch.	Sef cyfeir o'i gyfoeth a fynnei ei hela, Glynn Cuch.	The place of his realm which he wanted to hunt (in) was Glynn (= 'the glen') Cuch.
5.	Ac ef a gychwynnwys y nos honno o Arberth.	Ac ef a gychwynnwys y nos honno o Arberth.	And he started that night from Narberth.
6.	Ac a doeth hyt ym Penn Llwyn Diarwya,	Ac a ddoeth hyd ym Mhenn Llwyn Diarwya.	And he came as far as in the beginning of Llwyn (= 'the grove') Diarwyd.
7.	Ac yno y bu y nos honno.	Ac yno y bu y nos honno.	And there he was that night.
8.	A thrannoeth yn ieuengtit y dyd kyuodi a oruc.	A thrannoeth yn ieuenctid y dydd cyfodi a orug.	And 'across the night' (= next day), 'in the youth of the day' (= in the morning) rise he did.
9.	A dyuot y Lynn Cuch i ellwng e gwn dan y coet.	A dyfod i Lynn Cuch i ellwng ei gwn dan y coed.	And he (did) come to Glynn Cuch to let loose his dogs into the forest.
10.	A chanu y gorn, a dechreu dygyuor yr hela.	A chanu ei gorn, a dechreu dygyfor yr hela.	And (did) sound his horn, and (did) 'stir' (= begin) the hunt.

== See also ==
- Geiriadur Prifysgol Cymru, the standard historical Welsh dictionary
- Medieval Welsh literature, Book of Llandaff, Mabinogion, Welsh law
- Welsh orthography
