= Old Welsh =

800s–1100s period of the Welsh language

- Native to: Wales and western England
- Era: Evolved into Middle Welsh about the 12th century
- Language family: Indo-European: Celtic; Insular Celtic; Brittonic; Western Brittonic; Old Welsh
- Early form: Common Brittonic
- Writing system: Latin

Language codes
- ISO 639-3: owl
- Glottolog: oldw1241

Old Welsh (Welsh: Hen Gymraeg) is the stage of the Welsh language from about 800 AD until the early 12th century, when it developed into Middle Welsh. The preceding period, from the time Welsh became distinct from Common Brittonic around 550, has been called "Primitive" or "Archaic Welsh".

== Phonology ==
The phonology of Old Welsh is as follows.

Consonant phonemes
	Labial		Dental		Alveolar		Palatal	Velar		Glottal
Nasal	m̥ʰ	m			n̥ʰ	n		ŋ̊ʰ	ŋ	
Stop	p	b			t	d		k	ɡ	
Fricative	ɸ	β	θ	ð	s			x		h
Approximant	w				r̥ʰ	r	j			
Lateral					l	ɬ				

Vowel phonemes
	Front	Central	Back
Close	i	ɨ ʉ	u
Mid	e	(ə) (ɵ)	o
Open		a	

- Older /ɔ/ was diphthongized into /aw/ in (stressed) final syllables, but it was retained elsewhere. Whilst this persisted as a diphthong in Middle Welsh, in Modern Welsh /aw/ has collapsed to /o/ following the stress shift to the penultimate, except in monosyllables.
- [ə] and [ɵ] were allophones of /ɨ/ and /u/ in unstressed non-final syllables. In Middle Welsh these merged to [ə].
- Old Welsh /ei/ and /eʉ/ became /ai/ and /aɨ/ in Modern Welsh final syllables, in dialects where /ɨ/ has not merged with /i/.

== Texts ==
The oldest surviving text entirely in Old Welsh is understood to be that on a gravestone now in St Cadfan’s Church, Tywyn – the Cadfan Stone – thought to date from the 7th century, although more recent scholarship dates it in the 9th century. A key body of Old Welsh text also survives in glosses and marginalia from around 900 in the Juvencus Manuscript and in De raris fabulis. Some examples of medieval Welsh poems and prose additionally originate from this period, but are found in later manuscripts; Y Gododdin, for example, is preserved in Middle Welsh. A text in Latin and Old Welsh in the Lichfield Gospels called the "Surrexit Memorandum" is thought to have been written in the early 8th century but may be a copy of a text from the 6th or 7th centuries.

=== Surrexit Memorandum ===
==== Text ====
Words in bold are Latin, not Old Welsh.

surexit tutbulc filius liuit hagener tutri dierchi tir telih haioid ilau elcu filius gelhig haluidt iuguret amgucant pel amtanndi ho diued diprotant gener tutri o guir imguodant ir degion guragon tagc rodesit elcu guetig equs tres uache, tres uache nouidligi namin ir ni be cas igridu dimedichat guetig hit did braut grefiat guetig nis minn tutbulc hai cenetl in ois oisau

==== Translation ====
Tudfwlch son of Llywyd and son-in-law of Tudri arose to claim the land of Telych, which was in the hand of Elgu son of Gelli and the tribe of Idwared. They disputed long about it; in the end they disjudge Tudri's son-in-law by law. The goodmen said to each other 'Let us make peace'. Elgu gave afterwards a horse, three cows, three cows newly calved, in order that there might not be hatred between them from the ruling afterwards till the Day of Judgement. Tudfwlch and his kin will not want it for ever and ever.

==== Features ====
- The text shows many of the early spelling conventions of Welsh, when the basic Latin alphabet was used to represent the phonology of Old Welsh. At this stage, the use of ⟨ll⟩ to represent the lateral fricative /ɬ/ and ⟨dd⟩ to represent /ð/ had not been developed. The Latin letter ⟨u⟩ was used to represent both the consonant /w/ and vowel /u/.
- Initial mutations, a major feature of later Welsh, do not appear in orthography at this point.
- Not all language used in the Memorandum was inherited by later Welsh. The following are words with clear Modern Welsh descendants:

Old Welsh	Modern Welsh	English
tir	tir	land
lau	llaw	hand
haluidt	a llwyth	and (the) tribe
diued	diwedd	end
ir	yr, y	the
nouid	newydd	new
guetig	wedi	after
cas	cas	hatred
hit	hyd	until
did	dydd	day
braut	brawd	judgement
in ois oisou	yn oes oesoedd	for ever and ever

Page 141 (on which the text is written) also has a Latin memorandum above the Old Welsh text. It appears to hold more text written below the main text, and a mysterious section where text appears to have been erased, both of which are partially overwritten with Old English text. No translations or transcripts have yet been offered for this section.

It is unknown why that particular page was used for the glosses, as little or no text appears to have been added to any of the other pages in the Lichfield Gospels.

== See also ==
- British Latin

== Sources ==
- Davies, John (ed.). Encyclopaedia Wales. University of Wales Press.
- Edwards, Nancy (2013). A Corpus of Early Medieval Inscribed Stones and Stone Sculpture in Wales. Vol. 3, North Wales. Cardiff: University of Wales Press.
- Koch, John T. (2006). Celtic Culture: A Historical Encyclopedia. ABC-CLIO.
- Medieval Vision: The Visual Culture of Wales. Cardiff: University of Wales Press. 2003.
- Willis, David (2009). The Celtic Languages (PDF). London: Routledge.
