= A String in the Harp =

1976 novel by Nancy Bond

- First edition cover
- Author: Nancy Bond
- Illustrator: Allen Davis
- Cover artist: Allen Davis
- Language: English
- Genre: Children's Fantasy
- Publisher: Atheneum Books
- Publication date: 1976
- Publication place: United States
- Media type: Print
- Pages: 370 pp
- Awards: Newbery Honor; 1977; Tir na n-Og Award; 1977
- ISBN: 068950036X
- OCLC: 14272089

A String in the Harp is a children's fantasy novel by Nancy Bond first published in 1976. It received a 1977 Newbery Honor award and the Welsh Tir na n-Og Award. It tells of the American Morgan family who temporarily move to Wales, where Peter Morgan finds a magical harp key that gives him vivid visions of the past. This well-received novel is an unusual time travel story, with its focus on the emotional pain and separation the Morgans experience after the death of their mother and the gradual healing they find through their experiences.

== Plot summary ==
The novel is about the American Morgan family and their experiences in Wales. The Morgan family originally settled in Wales at the behest of Mrs. Morgan, who wanted to relocate from Boston. Mrs. Morgan passes away before the start of the novel, leaving her family in Wales. The novel opens a year after her death as the older daughter Jen is flying from America to Wales to join her family for Christmas.

Mr. Morgan has taken a temporary teaching position at the University of Aberystwyth and with the two younger children is living in a nearby seaside village. Jen is dismayed to find their home cold and uncomfortable, her brother and sister unhappy, and their father ignoring them. She eventually convinces her father to let her remain with the family in Wales instead of finishing high school in America. To supplement the lack of a traditional education, her father gives her challenging reading assignments.

Peter Morgan, who dislikes living in Wales, becomes fascinated by a mysterious object that he found by the shore. He finds out that it is a harp-tuning key that once belonged to the Celtic bard Taliesin. The key has a subtle magical power that enables Peter to see visions of Taliesin's life. Soon it is not only Peter who is seeing visions, and the whole family witnesses an ancient battle on Borth Bog, although they do not realize what is happening. A she-wolf is caught in a hunt, despite their being extinct in Wales.

John Owen of the National Museum gets wind of the key's existence and tries to obtain it for the museum. However, Peter becomes convinced that the key should instead be returned to Taliesin. At the end of the story, Peter manages to find Taliesin's secret grave and return the key.

== Setting ==
The principal setting is Borth, a coastal village near Aberystwyth. Other scenes are set in contemporary Aberystwyth and Cardiff and in sixth-century Britain.

== Characters ==
- Jennifer Morgan, a 15-year-old American girl
- Peter Morgan, her 12-year-old brother
- Becky Morgan, her 10-year-old sister
- David Morgan, a university teacher of English, widowed father of Jen, Peter, and Becky.
- Mrs. Davies, the Morgans' English-born neighbor and daily help, who runs a bed and breakfast.
- Gwilym Davies, her schoolboy son, a keen birdwatcher who becomes friends with the Morgan children.
- Rhian Evans, a Welsh schoolfriend of Becky's, who lives on a sheep farm in the hills with her family.
- Dr. Gwyn Rhys, Director of Welsh Studies at the University of Aberystwyth, David's friend and colleague.
- Dr. John Owen of the National Museum in Cardiff.

In the past

- Taliesin, a Welsh bard of the sixth century
- Aneirin, a bard, Taliesin's companion and guide
- Elphin Rheged, Taliesin's pupil, a son of Urien Rheged
- Gwyddno Garanhir, king of Ceredigion, Taliesin's patron and friend
- Maelgwn Gwynedd, king of Gwynedd

== Background ==
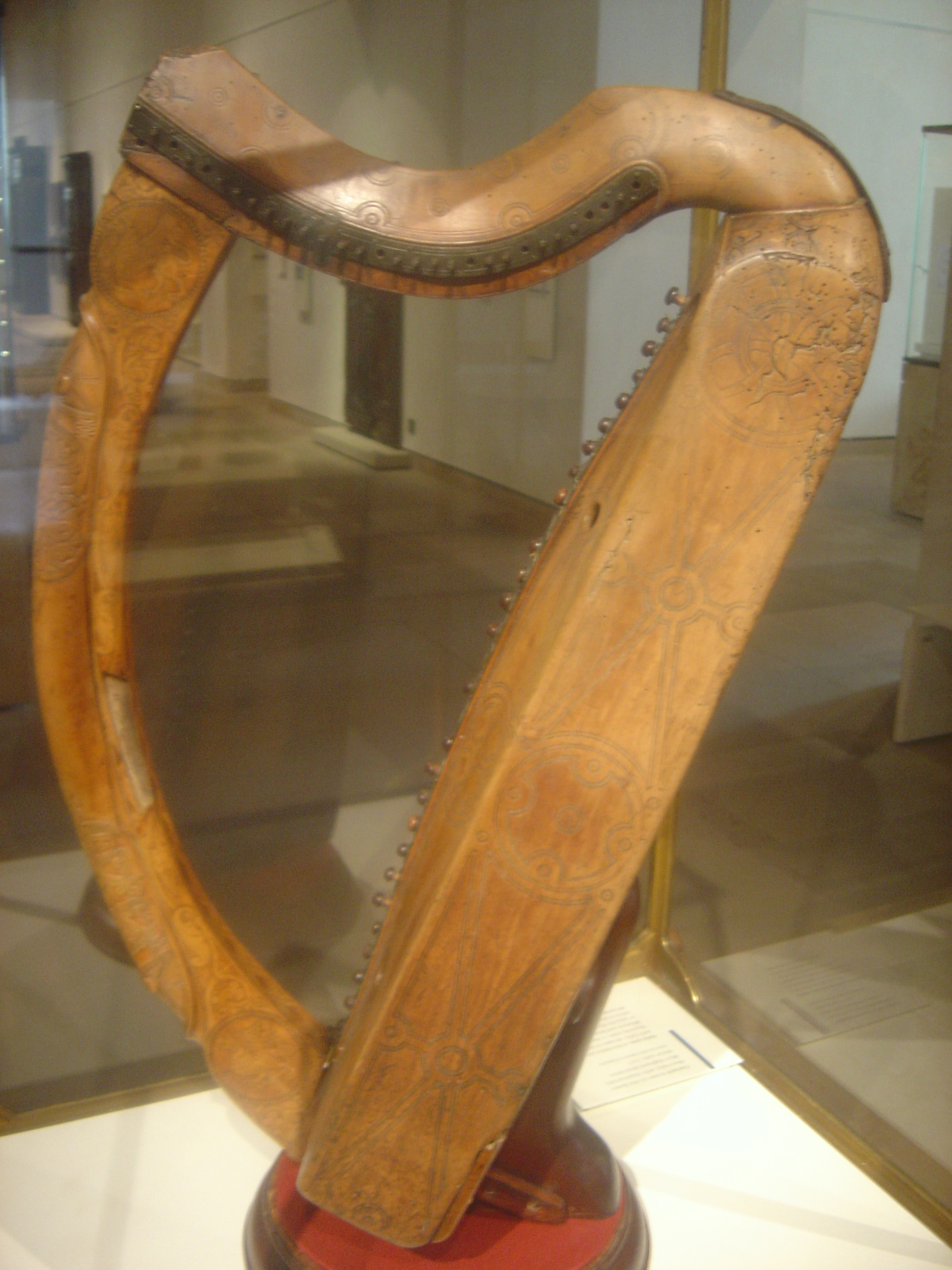
This Scottish clàrsach, now in the Museum of Scotland, Edinburgh, is one of only three surviving medieval Gaelic harps.

Bond began A String in the Harp while looking for a job after returning to the United States from a year in graduate school studying librarianship in Aberystwyth. She drew closely on her experiences and reactions to write the book, saying "the American family notices and adjusts to the same things I did". She did not intend to write a fantasy. "I consider myself a realistic kind of person, and it really surprised me in many ways that the first book I should write would be a fantasy." According to Elizabeth Briggs in On the Inside Looking In: Contemporary Anglo-Welsh Fantasy, non-Welsh authors use Welsh mythology in their books to develop a sense of fantasy and unreality. But Bond found using Taliesin's life was a good way to introduce Welsh history into the story. Because he was already associated with the area she was writing about and his presence helped convey a sense of the country's age to her American reading audience, she chose to use him as her link to Wales' past. She needed a talisman to trigger the fantasy sections of the story, and when she read that harp keys are essential for tuning she knew she had found an object she could use in the book. The visions the key brings to Peter and the others tie the various elements of the story together.

Taliesin was a British poet, or bard, of the 6th Century. The details of his life are sketchy and come only from his own poetry, so Bond filled in specific elements to suit her story. As mentioned in the book, Bedd Taliesin does mean 'Taliesins' grave', but his actual burial site is unknown. Although later mythology places him in the court of King Arthur, Bond wanted Taliesin to appear as real as possible, to help ground the fantasy sections of the book in reality.

== Fantasy elements ==
As a time travel fantasy, Deborah O'Keefe in Readers in Wonderland considered A String in the Harp an unusual form of the "Junior-Year-Abroad type of fantasy" because the children observe Taliesin and his world but never fully enter it. Another element that sets the novel apart from other time-travel books is the strong sense of realism that helps make her time-travel story convincing.

A String in the Harp has been compared to Susan Cooper's contemporary fantasy The Dark Is Rising Sequence. Both writers produced novels in the 1970s based on Welsh mythology, including the Mabinogion. Louisa Smith in the International Companion Encyclopedia Of Children's Literature, says Bond and Cooper "use the intrusion of the supernatural into everyday life as both threat and challenge". Children's Literature also compared the two writers, but felt that Bond's book emphasized family more than Cooper's, and that Bond used her magic as a way of bringing about growth in the Morgans' lives.

== Themes ==
The Newbery Companion calls A String in the Harp a "story of friendship and family problems". The difficulties between Peter and his father, and the entire family's attempts to cope with their grief over their mother's death, form the core of the novel. Their problems, and their struggle to accept the changes that entails, form the core of the book. University professor, author and folklore expert C. W. Sullivan said that "without the traditional Welsh materials, A String in the Harp would be just another adolescent problem novel".

In A String in the Harp Jenny is frustrated with her father's attitude toward Peter but she accepts his ineffectual parenting with little protest, and stays in Wales to take care of the house and her family, even though this means she will miss at least one year of high school. Writing in "A Guide to Newbery Medal Winners And Honor Books, 1977-1994", Judith Kinman calls Jenny's taking over running the house after her mother's death sexist, and says it makes the book difficult to recommend to young readers. She also cites Jenny's belief that she should be able to mediate between her father and brother as an example of stereotyping a girl's role as caregiver.

Though Mr. Morgan is a university professor, Peter grumbles constantly about school and the irrelevant facts he feels forced to learn, including Welsh. Jenny is allowed to stay in Wales and miss a year of school though she does do some reading and keeps a journal. Thus, according to Ann Hildebrand in The Dreary Time: The Ethos of School in Award-Winning Fiction for Children, Bond's book reinforces the idea that school is an unpleasant necessity that keeps a child from more enjoyable and meaningful activities.

Gladys Hunt, in Read for Your Life, gives two themes for the book. The first speaks of the possibility of magical happenings in the real world. Though Jenny at first refuses to imagine that Peter's talk of visions could be true, other characters are not so certain. Mr. Evans the farmer maintains that there are "things as can't be explained", despite the skepticism of his family. Later in the story Jenny visits Professor Rhys and tells him about Peter's visions, hoping he will give her a reasonable explanation for them. Instead he shocks her by admitting he believes magical occurrences are possible and superstitions may be rooted in facts, saying "the more I learn the less I know... Why should there not be forces we do not understand?" The second theme Hunt mentions is that people's lives form patterns, sometimes woven together so that the actions of one may affect another's, even centuries apart, as Peter returning Taliesin's key brings peace to both of them.

== Critical reception ==
A String in the Harp received a Newbery Honor award for 1977. It also won the 1977 International Reading Association Children's Book Award, was named an American Library Association Notable Book, a Boston Globe-Horn Book Honor Book, and Horn Book Magazine named it a Best Book for 1977. The Welsh National Centre for Children's Literature gave A String in the Harp the Tir na n-Og Award for the best book written in English with "an authentic Welsh background". Though A String in the Harp received the Tir na n-Og Award in 1977, as of 1995 it still had not been published in Britain.

Along with awards A String in the Harp received positive reviews from major publications. Kirkus Reviews praised the descriptions of the Welsh country and weather and the likability of the characters. Kirkus also appreciated that Bond managed to avoid any excesses of the typical Arthurian fantasy, keeping the family's growth and emotional healing as the focus. Elleman reported some reviewers have criticized the length of the book, but feels those who finish it will find it memorable. In Read for Your Life Gladys Hunt tells teens "you may find this to be one of the most satisfying books of fantasy you have ever read".

== See also ==
- Book of Taliesin
- National Library of Wales
- The Chronicles of Prydain
