= Urien Yrechwydd =

Gweith Gwen Ystrat
- "The Battle of Gwen Ystrad"
- Author(s): unknown
- Ascribed to: Taliesin
- Language: late Old Welsh or Middle Welsh
- Manuscript(s): Book of Taliesin (NLW MS Peniarth 2)
- Genre: praise poem
- Period covered: late 6th century
- Personages: Urien, prince of Rheged

Urien Yrechwydd (in English: Urien of Yrechwydd) is a late Old Welsh or Middle Welsh heroic poem found uniquely in the Book of Taliesin. It is among those poems in the manuscript thought by Ifor Williams possibly to have originated as part of a sixth-century corpus of Canu Taliesin, a series of poems really composed by the semi-legendary sixth-century court poet of Rheged, Taliesin.

== Location of Yrechwydd ==
This poem and another of the Taliesin corpus, Argoed Llwyfain, characterise Urien as lord of Yrechwydd/Erechwydd, a place whose whereabouts has occasioned much debate, with implications for guessing the historical extent of the kingdom of Rheged. The Welsh word echwydd is thought to have meant 'fresh (of water); fresh water; ?cataract', suggesting that Yrechwydd was in the vicinity of fresh water. The most recent extensive studies, by Andrew Breeze, conclude that

Sir Ifor Williams thought it might be the Lake District, with plenty of fresh water (if not too much), where he is hesitantly followed by John Koch. But this makes no sense. The great area of fresh water in the Old North was that on the lower Ouse and Trent, a prodigious marsh that stretched from north of York to south of Gainsborough, sixty miles away in Lincolnshire. We can be sure that Yrechwydd was the area bordering that marsh, and hence equivalent to modern North Yorkshire, including York itself.

== Text ==
Uryen yr echwyd. haelaf dyn bedyd.
lliaws a rodyd y dynyon eluyd.
Mal y kynnullyd yt wesceryd.
llawen beird bedyd tra vo dy uuchyd.
ys mwy llewenyd gan clotuan clotryd.
ys mwy gogonyant vot Uryen ae plant.
Ac ef yn arbennic yn oruchel wledic.
yn dinas pellennic. yn keimyat kynteic.
lloegrwys ae gwydant pan ymadrodant.
agheu a gawssant a mynych godyant
llosci eu trefret a dwyn eu tudet
ac eimwnc collet a mawr aghyffret
heb gaffel gwaret. rac vryen reget.
Reget diffreidyat clot ior agor gwlat
vy mod yssyd arnat. O pop erclywat
dwys dy peleitrat pan erclywat kat.
kat pan y kyrchynt gwnyeith a wneit.
Tan yn tei kyn dyd rac vd yr echwyd.
Yr echwyd teccaf ae dynyon haelhaf.
gnawt eigyl heb waessaf. am teyrn glewhaf.
glewhaf eissyllyd tydi goreu yssyd.
or a uu ac a uyd. nyth oes kystedlyd.
pan dremher arnaw ys ehalaeth y braw.
Gnawt gwyled ymdanaw am teyrn gocnaw.
Amdanaw gwyled. a lliaws maranhed
eurteyrn gogled arbenhic teyrned.
Ac yny vallwyf hen
Ym dygyn agheu aghen.
ny bydif ym dirwen
na molwyfi vryen.

Urien of Yrechwydd,
Most bountiful of Christian,
Much you bestow
On the men of this land.
As you gather in,
So you give away.
Joyful Christendom's poets
As long as you live.
Greater is the joy
To have such a hero,
Greater is the glory
Of Urien and his offspring,
Since he is chieftain,
Ruler supreme,
Wayfarers' refuge,
Powerful champion.

Lloegr-men know him
As they will report:
Death's what they get
And pain a-plenty,
Their dwellings ablaze
And their garments seized,
And heavy losses
And grievous hardship,
Getting no deliverance
From Urien of Rheged.

Rheged's defender,
Renowned lord, land's anchor,
I delight in you
From all that's reported:
Savage your spear-thrust
When battle is sounded.
When you charge into battle
You wreak a slaughter,
Houses fired before daybreak
By Yrechwydd'slord.

Most fair, Yrechwydd,
And most bountiful its men.
No safeguard for Angles:
Round the bravest ruler,
The bravest offspring.
You yourself are best:
Was not nor will be
Ever your equal.
When one beholds him
Great is the terror.
Ever joy around him,
Round a spirited monarch,
Around him rejoicing
And abundant riches,
Golden king of the north,
High lord of monarch.
And until I die, old,
By death's strict demand,
I shall not be joyful
Unless I praise Urien.
