= Dafydd Ddu o Hiraddug =

Dafydd Ddu o Hiraddug (died 1371), also known as Dafydd Ddu Athro o Hiraddug, was a Welsh language poet, grammarian, and Roman Catholic priest in the diocese of Llanelwy (St Asaph). He was once believed to be the son of a certain Hywel ap Madog of Tremeirchion, but this has now been disproven.

Dafydd composed poems on religious themes; his surviving work includes poems on the Ten Commandments, Salvation, and on the ephemeracy of human life and of God's judgement to come after death. Dafydd is also thought to be the composer of the "Gwasanaeth Mair" (Mary's Service), a poetical translation of the Latin "Horae beatae Mariae virginis" (a Book of Hours) into Welsh.

Dafydd's greatest fame lies with his revised edition of the llyfr cerddwriaeth or bardic grammar of Einion Offeiriad.

Dafydd was probably buried in Dyserth, north Wales.

== Bibliography ==
- R. Geraint Gruffydd and Rhiannon Ifans (eds.), Gwaith Einion Offeriad a Dafydd Ddu o Hiraddug (Aberystwyth, 1997)
