= Awen =

Poetic inspiration in Welsh

Awen is a Welsh, Cornish and Breton word for "inspiration" (and typically poetic inspiration). In Welsh mythology, awen is the inspiration of the poets, or bards; its personification, Awen is the inspirational muse of creative artists in general. The inspired individual (often a poet or a soothsayer) is an awenydd.

In current usage, awen is sometimes ascribed to musicians and poets. Awen also occurs as a female given name. The word appears in the third stanza of "Hen Wlad fy Nhadau", the national anthem of Wales.

== Etymology ==
Awen derives from the Indo-European root *-uel, meaning 'to blow', and has the same root as the word awel meaning 'breeze' in Welsh and 'wind' or 'gale' in Cornish.

== Historical attestation ==
The first recorded attestation of the word occurs in Nennius's Historia Brittonum, a Latin text of c. 796, based in part on earlier writings by the monk, Gildas. It occurs in the phrase Tunc talhaern tat aguen in poemate claret [Talhaern the father of the muse was then renowned in poetry] where the Old Welsh word aguen (awen) occurs in the Latin text describing poets from the sixth century.

It is also recorded in its current form in Canu Llywarch Hen (c. 9th~10th century) where Llywarch says 'I know by my awen' indicating it as a source of instinctive knowledge.

On connections between awen as poetic inspiration and as an infusion from the divine, The Book of Taliesin often implies this. A particularly striking example is contained in the lines:

ban pan doeth peir	when arrives [the] poet
ogyrwen awen teir	revealed will be inspiration three

Perhaps more accurately “the three elements of inspiration that came, splendid, out of the cauldron”, but also implicitly “that came from God” as ‘peir’ (cauldron, poet) can also mean ‘sovereign’ often meaning ‘God’. It is the “three elements” that is cleverly worked in here as awen was sometimes characterised as consisting of three sub-divisions (‘ogyrwen’) so “the ogyrwen of triune inspiration”, perhaps suggesting the Trinity.

There are fifteen occurrences of the word awen in The Book of Taliesin as well as several equivalent words or phrases, such as ogyrven which is used both as a division of the awen (‘Seven score ogyrven which are in awen, shaped in Annwfn) as well as an alternative word for awen itself. The poem Armes Prydain [The Prophecies of Britain] begins with the phrase ‘awen foretells ...’, and it is repeated later in the poem. The link between poetic inspiration and divination is implicit in the description of the awenyddion [inspiration] given by Gerald of Wales in the 12th century and the link between bardic expression and prophecy is a common feature of much early verse in Wales and elsewhere.

A poem in The Black Book of Carmarthen by an unidentified bard, but addressed to Cuhelyn Fardd (1100-1130) asks God to allow the awen to flow so that ‘inspired song from Ceridwen will shape diverse and well-crafted verse’. This anticipates much poetry from identified bards of the Welsh princes between c. 1100-1300; it juggles the competing claims of the Celtic Church as the source of awen, with the pair Ceridwen [the cauldron of Ceridwen].

So Llywarch ap Llywelyn (1173–1220) – also known as ‘Prydydd y Moch’ [Poet of Pigs] – can address his patron Llywelyn ap Iorwerth like this:

I greet my lord, bring awen’s great greeting
Words from Ceridwen I compose
Just like Taliesin when he freed Elffin.

ap Llywelyn also wrote

The Lord God grant me sweet awen
As from the Cauldron of Ceridwen

Elidr Sais (c. 1195-1246), ‘singing to Christ’, wrote

Brilliant my poetry after Myrddin
Shining forth from the cauldron of awen

Dafydd Benfras (1220–1258) included both Myrddin and Aneirin in his backward glance:

Full of awen as Myrddin desired
Singing praise as Aneirin before me
when he sang of ‘Gododdin’.'

Later in the Middle Ages the identification of the source of the awen begins to shift from Ceridwen to more orthodox Christian sources such as the Virgin Mary, the saints, or directly from God. A full discussion can be found in Bosco (1996).

The Bardic Grammars of the later Middle Ages identify ‘The Holy Spirit’ as the proper source of the awen. The 15th century bard Siôn Cent argued that God is the only source and dismissed the “lying awen” of bards who thought otherwise as in his dismissive lines

A claimant false this awen is found
Born of hell’s furnace underground

Such a focus on an unmediated source was picked up by the 18th century neo-druid Iolo Morgannwg (pen name of Edward Williams, 1747-1826) who invented the awen symbol /|\ , claiming that it was an ancient druidic sign of “the ineffable name of God, being the rays of the rising sun at the equinoxes and solstices, conveying into focus the eye of light”.

Giraldus Cambrensis referred to those inspired by the awen collectively as "awenyddion" in his Description of Wales (1194):

There are certain persons in Cambria, whom you will find nowhere else, called Awenyddion, or people inspired; when consulted upon any doubtful event, they roar out violently, are rendered beside themselves, and become, as it were, possessed by a spirit. They do not deliver the answer to what is required in a connected manner; but the person who skillfully observes them, will find, after many preambles, and many nugatory and incoherent, though ornamented speeches, the desired explanation conveyed in some turn of a word: They are then roused from their ecstasy, as from a deep sleep, and, as it were, by violence compelled to return to their proper senses. After having answered the questions, they do not recover till violently shaken by other people; nor can they remember the replies they have given. If consulted a second or third time upon the same point, they will make use of expressions totally different; perhaps they speak by the means of fanatic and ignorant spirits. These gifts are usually conferred upon them in dreams: Some seem to have sweet milk or honey poured on their lips; others fancy that a written schedule is applied to their mouths and on awaking they publicly declare that they have received this gift.

In 1694, the Welsh poet Henry Vaughan wrote to his cousin, the antiquarian John Aubrey, in response to a request for some information about the remnants of Druidry in existence in Wales at that time, saying

... the ancient Bards ... communicated nothing of their knowledge, but by way of tradition: Which I suppose to be the reason that we have no account left nor any sort of remains, or other monuments of their learning of way of living. As to the later Bards, you shall have a most curious Account of them. This vein of poetrie they called Awen, which in their language signifies rapture, or a poetic furor & (in truth) as many of them as I have conversed with are (as I may say) gifted or inspired with it. I was told by a very sober, knowing person (now dead) that in his time, there was a young lad fatherless & motherless, so very poor that he was forced to beg; but at last was taken up by a rich man, that kept a great stock of sheep upon the mountains (not far from the place where I now dwell) who cloathed him & sent him into the mountains to keep his sheep.

There in Summer time following the sheep & looking to their lambs, he fell into a deep sleep in which he dreamt, that he saw a beautiful young man with a garland of green leafs upon his head, & a hawk upon his fist: With a quiver full of Arrows at his back, coming towards him (whistling several measures or tunes all the way) at last let the hawk fly at him, which (he dreamt) got into his mouth & inward parts, & suddenly awaked in a great fear & consternation: But possessed with such a vein, or gift of poetry, that he left the sheep & went about the Country, making songs upon all occasions, and came to be the most famous Bard in all the Country in his time.

— Henry Vaughan, in a letter to John Aubrey, October 1694

A modern instance of the word awen is in the large inscription on the front of the Wales Millennium Centre in Cardiff, composed by the poet Gwyneth Lewis, which reads:

CREU GWIR FEL GWYDR O FFWRNAIS AWEN "To create truth like glass from inspiration's furnace"

== Modern Druidic symbol ==
Awen of Iolo Morganwg.

In some forms of modern Druidism, the term is symbolized by an emblem showing three straight lines that spread apart as they move downward, drawn within a circle or a series of circles of varying thickness, often with a dot, or point, atop each line. The British Druid Order attributes the symbol to Iolo Morganwg; it has been adopted by some neo-Druids.

According to Jan Morris, Iolo Morganwg did in fact create what is now called "The Awen" as a symbol for the Gorsedd of Bards, the secret society of Welsh poets, writers, and musicians that he claimed to have rediscovered, but in fact created himself. Morganwg, whose own beliefs were, according to Marcus Tanner, "a compound of Christianity and Druidism, Philosophy and Mysticism", explained the Awen symbol as follows, "And God vocalizing His Name said /|\ , and with the Word all the world sprang into being, singing in ecstasy of joy /|\ and repeating the name of the Deity."

The Neo-Druid symbol of awen

The Order of Bards, Ovates and Druids (OBOD) describe the three lines as rays emanating from three points of light, with those points representing the triple aspect of deity and, also, the points at which the sun rises on the equinoxes and solstices – known as the Triad of the Sunrises. The emblem as used by the OBOD is surrounded by three circles representing the three circles of creation.

Various modern Druidic groups and individuals have their own interpretation of the awen. The three lines relate to earth, sea and air; body, mind and spirit; or love, wisdom and truth. It is also said that the awen stands for not simply inspiration, but for inspiration of truth; without awen one cannot proclaim truth. The three foundations of awen are the understanding of truth, the love of truth, and the maintaining of truth.

A version of the awen was approved by the United States Department of Veterans Affairs in early 2017 as an emblem for veteran headstones.

Banner of Gorsedh Kernow

Flag of the National Patriotic Front

== See also ==
- Muse
- Óðr
- Vates
- Welsh poetry
