= Hanes Taliesin =

Legendary biography of the poet Taliesin

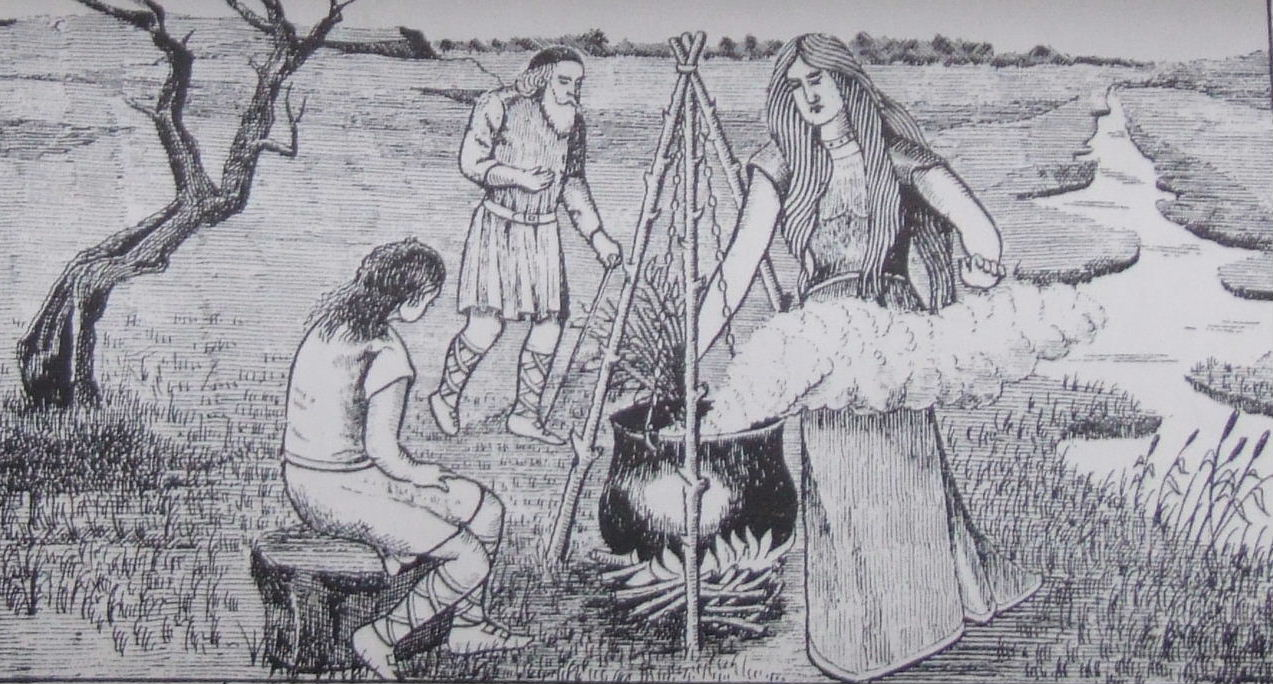
The boy Gwion attends to the Cauldron of Ceridwen

The Hanes Taliesin (Historia Taliesin, The Tale of Taliesin) is a legendary account of the life of the poet Taliesin recorded in the mid-16th century by Elis Gruffydd. The tale was also recorded in a slightly different version by John Jones of Gellilyfdy (c. 1607). This story agrees in many respects with fragmentary accounts in The Book of Taliesin and resembles the story of the boyhood of the Irish hero Fionn mac Cumhail and the salmon of wisdom in some respects. It was included in Lady Charlotte Guest's Mabinogion.

== Taliesin's birth ==
The legendary character began life as Gwion Bach, a servant to Ceridwen, the wife of a nobleman Tegid Foel, in the days when King Arthur ruled. She was a magician who had three arts she learned: enchantment, magic, and divination. Ceridwen had a beautiful daughter and an ugly son named Morfran, which means "Great Crow", whose appearance no magic could cure. Later he became known as Afagddu, which means "Utter Darkness". Ceridwen felt in order for him to gain respect and acceptance from noblemen he had to have great qualities to compensate for his ugly looks, so she sought to give him the gift of wisdom and knowledge. Through her arts she found a way of giving her son these special qualities, so she found special herbs from the earth to do this Inspiration (Awen), which had to be constantly stirred and cooked for a year and a day in a cauldron.

A blind man, Morda, was assigned by Ceridwen to stir the cauldron, while Gwion Bach, a young lad, stoked the fire underneath it. The first three drops of liquid from this cauldron would make one "extraordinarily learned in various arts and full of spirit of prophecy" (The Tale of Gwion Bach), and the rest was a fatal poison. After all Ceridwen's hard work she sat down, and accidentally fell asleep. While she was asleep the three drops sprang from the cauldron and Gwion Bach shoved Morfran out of the way so he could get the three drops. Instantly, he gained wisdom. Knowing from his wisdom that Ceridwen would be very angry once she found out what happened, he ran away.

All too soon he heard her fury and the sound of her pursuit. He turned himself into a hare on the land and she became a greyhound. He turned himself into a fish and jumped into a river: she then turned into an otter. He turned into a bird in the air, and in response she became a hawk.

Exhausted, Ceridwen managed to force him into a barn, where he turned into a single grain of corn and she became a tufted black hen and ate him. She became pregnant because of this. She resolved to kill the child, knowing it was Gwion, but when he was born he was so beautiful that she couldn't, so she had him put into a hide covered basket and thrown into the lake, river, or sea, depending on which version of this tale it is.

== Discovery by Elffin ==
The baby was found by Elphin, the son of Gwyddno Garanhir, 'Lord of Ceredigion', while fishing for salmon. Surprised at the whiteness of the boy's forehead, he exclaimed "this is a radiant forehead." (in Welsh: tal iesin). Taliesin, thus named, began to sing stanzas (poetry), known as Dehuddiant Elphin, saying:

Elffin deg taw ath wylo
na chabled neb yr eiddio
ny wna lles drwg obaitho
nid a wyl au portho
nid a n goeg gweddi cynllo
ny thyr duw yn addawo
ni chad ynghored wyddno
erioed gystal ac heno

Elffin deg sych dy ddau rudd
nyth weryd bod yn rhybudd
cyd tybiaist na cefaist ffudd
ny wna lles gormod awydd
nag ymaf wrthaf dofydd
cans o for ag o'r fynydd
ag o'n eigion afonydd
I'r tri Dduw da i dwedwydd

Elffin gynheddfaf diddan
anfilwriaidd yw damcan
nid rhaid yt ddirfawr gwynfan
gwell duw na drwg ddarogan
gyd bwyd eiddill a bychan
ar nod gorferwch mor dilan
mi a wnaf y nydd gyfran
wyt well na thri chant maran

Elffin gynheddaf hynod
na sori ar dy gyfaelod
gyd bwyd wan ar llawr nghygod
mae rinwedd ar fy n hafod
nid rhaid yr ddirfawr ofnod
tra wyf yn y'r gyfragod
trwy goffa'r enw'r drindod
ny ddychon neb dy orfod

Translation:

Fair Elffin, cease your weeping!
Despair brings no profit.
No catch in Gwyddno's weir
Was ever as good as tonight's.
Let no one revile what is his;
Man sees not what nurtures him.
Gwyddno's prayers shall not be in vain.
God breaks not his promises.

Fair Elphin, dry your cheeks!
It does not become you to be sad.
Though you think you have no gain
Undue grief will bring you nothing,
Nor will doubting the miracles of the Lord.
Though I am small, I am gifted.
From the sea and the mountain, from rivers' depths
God sent bounty to the blessed.

Elphin of cheerful disposition-
Meek is your mind.
You must not lament so heavily.
Better God than gloomy foreboding.
Though I am frail and little
And wet with spume of Dylan's sea,
I shall earn in a day of contention
Riches better than three score for you.

Elphin of the remarkable qualities,
Grieve not for your catch.
Though I am frail here in my bunting,
There are wonders on my tongue.
You must not fear greatly
While I am watching over you.
By remembering the name of the Trinity
None can overcome you.

Taliesin sang these stanzas all the way home, where Elphin gave Taliesin to his wife; together they raised him with love and happiness. Ever since Taliesin had become part of the family, Elphin's wealth had increased each day. Elphin became too proud, resulting in trouble with the king, but his wonderful son Taliesin saved him.

== Court of Maelgwn Gwynedd ==
Sometime later, during a Christmas feast, a crowd of lords, knights, and squires praised King Maelgwn Gwynedd. Amongst this, Elphin interjected that he had a wife who is even more chaste than the King's and that he also had a bard who is more proficient than all of the king's bards combined. When the king heard of this boast from his companions, he was very angry and imprisoned Elphin.

To test Elphin's claims, Maelgwn sent his son Rhun (who had a reputation of never being turned down by a woman) to Elphin's house to despoil his wife's virtue. Taliesin intervened just in time with a clever scheme that involved his mistress exchanging places with a scullery maid. Rhun sat down to have dinner with the disguised maid, and when she fell asleep he cut off a finger of hers that wore Elphin's signet ring. When the king saw this, he tried to boast to Elphin that his wife was not so virtuous after all. Elphin then calmly inspected the finger and told the king that there was no way that this finger actually belonged to his wife. The size was wrong, the nails were not manicured enough, and there was evidence of kneading rye dough which was not an activity that his wife took part in. This angered the king even more, and Elphin was once again imprisoned.

To prove Elphin's boast about his bard, Taliesin showed up at Maelgwn's court. Somehow, Taliesin supernaturally enchanted the king's bards so that they could only pucker their lips and make nonsensical sounds. When the king summoned Taliesin to see why this was done, Taliesin replied to the king in a series of stanzas. Taliesin's wisdom amazed and intimidated the king, so he decided to release Elphin.

Once freed, Taliesin provoked Elphin to wager that he also had a faster horse than the king. This resulted in a race to prove that boast. Under Taliesin's instruction, Elphin whipped each of the king's 24 horses on the rump with a burnt holly stick. A cap was thrown down exactly where Elphin's horse finished, and gold was later discovered to be buried under the same spot. In this way, Taliesin repaid his master for taking him in and raising him.

The tale of Taliesin ends with him telling prophecies to the Maelgwn about the origin of the human race and what will now happen to the world.

== Parallels ==
The story of Taliesin's birth resembles the story of the boyhood of the Irish hero Fionn mac Cumhail and the salmon of wisdom.

A close parallel outside Celtic mythology can be found in Saxo Grammaticus' Gesta Danorum (V.2.6-V.2.8, 12th c.), where Eric, son of Regnerus, acquired eloquence and wisdom by eating the snake-infested stew his step-mother Kraka had prepared for his half-brother Roller. Saxo's tale also involves a cauldron, but more frequently, the motif seems to be associated with eating (parts of a) snake, e.g., in the Icelandic Volsunga Saga (late 13th century), where Sigurd gained the knowledge of the speech of birds after tasting the heart of the serpent (dragon) Fafnir. In this form, the motif is well-known in European fairy tales and corresponds to Aarne–Thompson type 673 (KHM 17, see The White Serpent's flesh), frequently found in Central and Eastern Europe, but also in Scotland, Ireland, Scandinavia, in the Baltic countries and occasionally also outside Europe.

The story that Taliesin's stanzas were clear whereas the king's bards made only nonsensical sounds may actually have a basis in linguistics, as Brythonic grammar underwent substantial changes during this period, marked by the loss of unvoiced final syllables (i.e., most Indo-European inflectional morphology) and the grammaticalization of consonant mutation. If the bards' poetic language preserved more archaic features than the common language spoken at the time, Taliesin may just have been more easily understood by his contemporaries. For Irish, a similar situation of diglossia is recorded for the transition from Primitive Irish (Ogam) to Old Irish.

== See also ==
- Aneirin
- Mabinogion
