= White snake =

White snake, whitesnake or white serpent may refer to:

== Music ==
- Whitesnake, an English hard rock band
  - White Snake (album) (1977), first solo album by David Coverdale
  - Whitesnake (album) (also known as 1987 and Serpens Albus), a 1987 album by the band Whitesnake
- "Whitesnake", a song by the British band Late of the Pier from their 2008 album Fantasy Black Channel

== Literature ==
- "The White Snake", a German fairy tale included in Grimm's Fairy Tales
- "The White Snake", an 1892 short story by Andrew Lang
- "The White Snake", a 1971 poem by Anne Sexton
- The White Serpent, a 1988 fantasy novel by Tanith Lee
- Whitesnake, a Stand of Enrico Pucci, the main antagonist of Part 6 of the Japanese manga series JoJo's Bizarre Adventure

== Theatre and film ==
- The White Snake, a 2013 play by Mary Zimmerman
- White Snake (film), a 2019 animated fantasy film directed by Amp Wong and Zhao Ji

== See also ==
- "The Case of the White Snake", a 1945 short story by Margery Lawrence
- Legend of the White Snake, a Chinese legend about a pair of ill-fated lovers
- Legend of the White Serpent, an alternate name for the 1958 Japanese animated The White Snake Enchantress (film)
