= Edmyg Dinbych =

C. 9th century Welsh poem

Edmyg Dinbych or Etmic Dinbych (Welsh for 'in praise of Tenby') is a Welsh poem or praise song, in reference to Tenby (Welsh: Dinbych-y-pysgod), in modern Pembrokeshire, Wales.

It's the earliest reference to a settlement at Tenby. The poem is probably from the 9th century, preserved in the 14th-century Book of Taliesin, although it wasn't written by the poet Taliesin. It was probably produced by a court poet in Dyfed to celebrate the New Year. It is the only court poem from South Wales from before the era of the Poets of the Princes that has survived. It survived as part of five diverse Welsh manuscripts possibly written at Cwmhir Abbey.

It was partly a lament for Bleiddud, Lord of Tenby.

== Sources ==
- Charles-Edwards, T. M. (2012). Wales and the Britons, 350-1064. Oxford University Press. ISBN 9780191744778.
- Pryce, Huw, ed. (1998). Literacy in Medieval Celtic Societies. Cambridge University Press. p. 29. ISBN 9780521570398.
- Nagy, Joseph Falaky (2005). "ʻ"The Praise of Tenby": A Late-Ninth-Century Welsh Court Poemʼ". Heroic poets and poetic heroes in Celtic tradition : a festschrift for Patrick K. Ford. Dublin: Four Courts Press. pp. 91–102. ISBN 978-1-85182-849-4.
