= Bedd Taliesin =

Listed Historic Monument and grave

Coordinates: 52.502°N 3.959°W

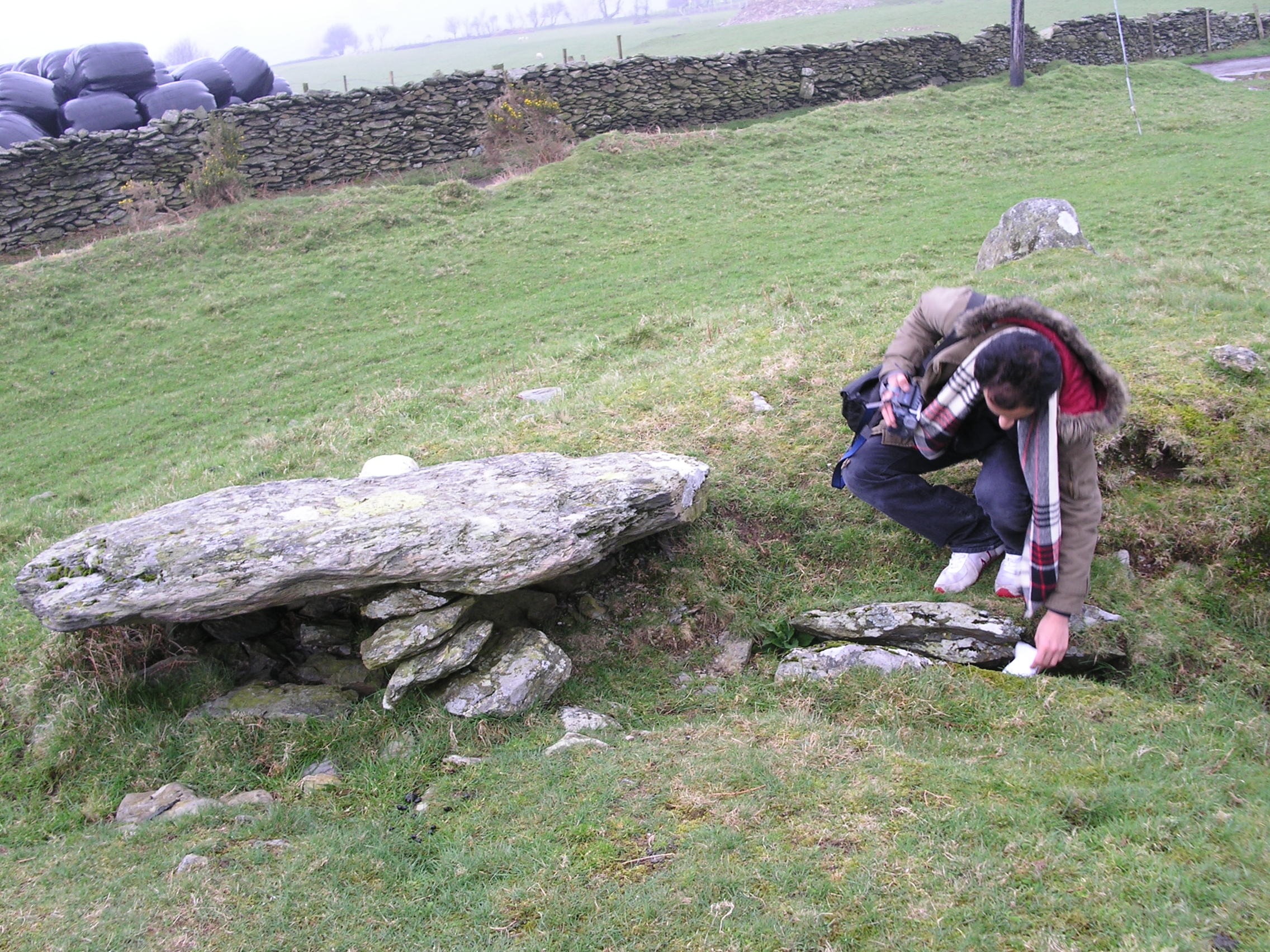
Bedd Taliesin

Bedd Taliesin is the legendary grave (bedd) of the poet Taliesin, located in Ceredigion, Wales. The Bronze Age round cairn is a listed Historic Monument (map ref: SN671912). It is a round-kerb cairn with a cist about 2m long. The capstone has fallen; the side stone slabs are more or less in their original positions.

The cairn has no proven connection with the historical Taliesin, a 6th-century poet esteemed by the poets of medieval Wales as the founder of the Welsh poetic tradition. His surviving work includes praise poems to the rulers of the early Welsh kingdom of Powys and Rheged, in the Hen Ogledd (modern northern England and southern Scotland). He became a figure of legend in medieval Wales and his association with Elffin ap Gwyddno, son of the king of the fabled Cantre'r Gwaelod, off the coast of Ceredigion, may account for the monument's name.

The antiquarian Edward Lhuyd recorded the local belief that if one spend a night on Taliesin's stone you would awake a poet or a madman.
