= Taliesin =

Sub-Roman Welsh poet

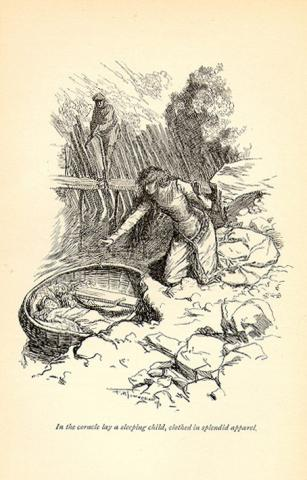
- The finding of Taliesin by Elphin and Angharad, F. H. Townsend's illustration for Thomas Love Peacock's The Misfortunes of Elphin (1897)
- Other name: Gwion Bach ap Gwreang
- Years active: 6th century AD
- Notable work: Llyfr Taliesin

Taliesin (/ˌtælˈjɛsɪn/ tal-YES-in, Welsh: [talˈjɛsɪn]; fl. 6th century AD) was an early Brittonic poet of Sub-Roman Britain whose work has possibly survived in a Middle Welsh manuscript, the Book of Taliesin. Taliesin was a renowned bard who is believed to have sung at the courts of at least three kings. Taliesin means "shining brow" in Welsh.

In 1960, Ifor Williams identified eleven of the medieval poems ascribed to Taliesin as possibly originating as early as the sixth century, and so possibly being composed by a historical Taliesin. The bulk of this work praises King Urien of Rheged and his son Owain mab Urien, although several of the poems indicate that Taliesin also served as court bard to King Brochfael Ysgithrog of Powys and his successor Cynan Garwyn, either before or during his time at Urien's court. Some of the events to which the poems refer, such as the Battle of Arfderydd (c. 573), are referred to in other sources.

John T. Koch argues that the description of Easter in the praise poem Yspeil Taliesin ('The Spoils of Taliesin') indicates that Urien and Taliesin were Christians who adhered to the Latin rather than the Insular observance of Easter. He also suggests that the figure of Taliesin served as a bridge between the worlds of Brittonic Christian Latin literature and the Heroic Age court poets, allowing monastic scribes to cultivate vernacular poetry.

In legend and medieval Welsh poetry, he is often referred to as Taliesin Ben Beirdd ("Taliesin, Chief of Bards" or chief of poets). He is mentioned as one of the five British poets of renown, along with Talhaearn Tad Awen ("Talhaearn Father of the Muse"), Aneirin, Blwchfardd, and Cian Gwenith Gwawd ("Cian Wheat of Song"), in the Historia Brittonum, and is also mentioned in the collection of poems known as Y Gododdin. Taliesin was highly regarded in the mid-12th century as the supposed author of a great number of romantic legends.

According to legend Taliesin was adopted as a child by Elffin, the son of Gwyddno Garanhir, and prophesied the death of Maelgwn Gwynedd from the Yellow Plague. In later stories he became a mythic hero, companion of Bran the Blessed and King Arthur. His legendary biography is found in several late renderings (see below), the earliest surviving narrative being found in a manuscript chronicle of world history written by Elis Gruffydd in the 16th century.

== Biography ==
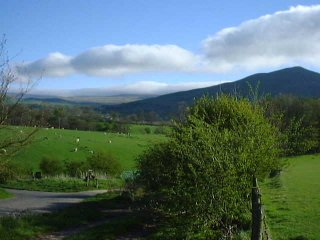
The Eden Valley between Appleby and Penrith, an area referred to affectionately as the heartland of Rheged in the praise poems of Taliesin

Details of Taliesin's life are sparse. The first mention of him occurs in the Saxon genealogies appended to four manuscripts of the Historia Brittonum from AD 828. The writer names five poets who lived in the time of Ida of Bernicia (fl. mid-6th century) and a British chieftain, (O)utigirn (Modern Welsh Eudeyrn), among them Taliesin. This information is considered fairly credible, since he is also mentioned by Aneirin, another of the five mentioned poets, who is famed as the author of Y Gododdin, a series of elegies to the men of the kingdom of Gododdin (now Lothian) who died fighting the Angles at the Battle of Catraeth around 600.

Taliesin's authorship of several odes to King Urien Rheged (died c. 550) is commonly accepted, and they mention The Eden Valley and an enemy leader, Fflamddwyn, identified as Ida or his son Theodric. The poems refer to victories of Urien at the battles of Argoed Llwyfain, The Ford of Clyde and Gwen Ystrad. Taliesin also sang in praise of Cynan Garwyn, king of Powys. Cynan's predecessor, Brochwel Ysgithrog, is also mentioned in later poems.

According to legends that first appear in the Book of Taliesin, Taliesin's early patron was Elffin ap Gwyddno, son of Gwyddno Garanhir, who was a lord of a lost land in Cardigan Bay called Cantre'r Gwaelod. Taliesin defended Elffin and satirised his enemy, the powerful Maelgwn Gwynedd, shortly before the latter died (probably in 547). The Latin-Breton Life of Iudic-hael refers to Taliesin visiting the monastery of Gildas at Rhuys in Brittany.

According to the Welsh Triads, Taliesin had a son, Afaon, who was accounted a great warrior, and who suffered a violent death, probably in Lothian. Taliesin's grave is held in folklore to be near the village of Tre Taliesin near Llangynfelyn called Bedd Taliesin, but this is a Bronze Age burial chamber, and the village of Tre-Taliesin, at the foot of the hill, was actually named after the burial chamber in the 19th century though legend was traced by Edward Lhuyd to the 17th century.

== Legendary accounts of his life ==
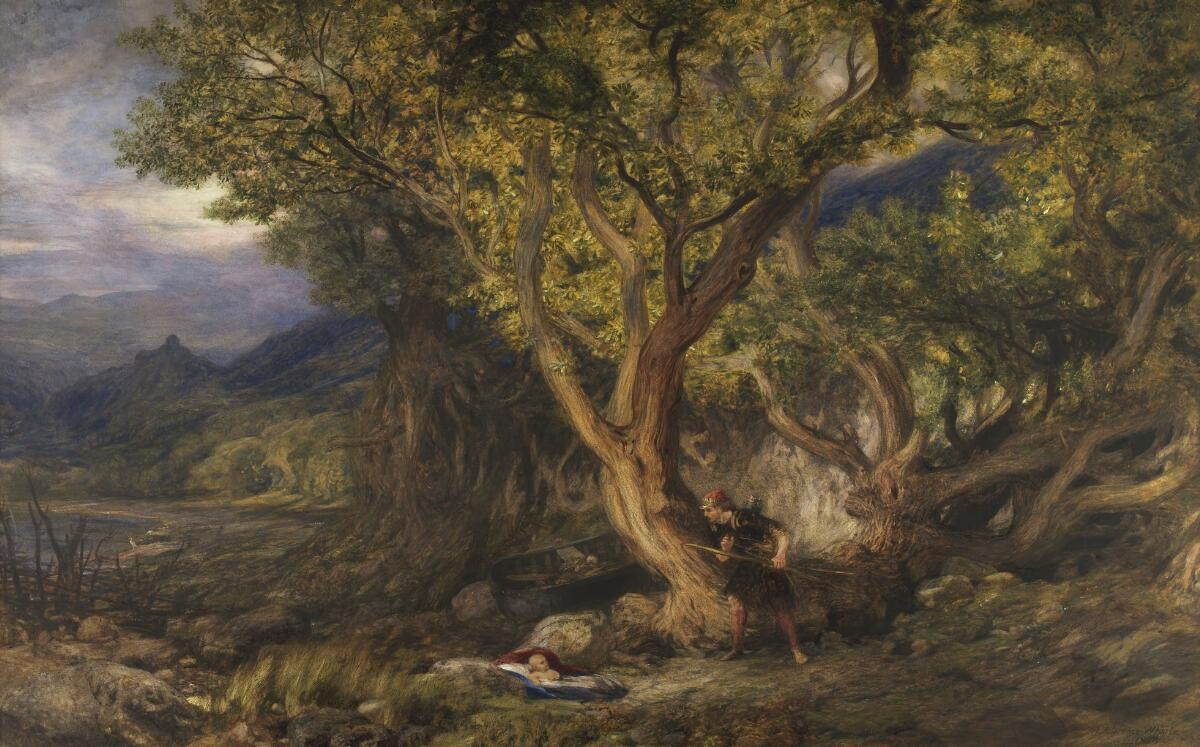
"Finding of Taliesin" by Henry Clarence Whaite, 1876

More detailed traditions of Taliesin's biography arose from about the 11th century, and in Historia Taliesin ("The Tale of Taliesin", surviving from the 16th century). In the mid-16th-century, Elis Gruffydd recorded a legendary account of Taliesin that resembles the story of the boyhood of the Irish hero Fionn mac Cumhail and the salmon of wisdom in some respects. The tale was also recorded in a slightly different version by John Jones of Gellilyfdy (c. 1607). This story agrees in many respects with fragmentary accounts in the Book of Taliesin.

According to the Hanes Taliesin, he was originally known as Gwion Bach ap Gwreang. He was a servant of Cerridwen and was made to stir the Cauldron of Inspiration for one year to allow for Cerridwen to complete her potion of inspiration. The potion was initially intended for her son, Morfran, who although was considered frightfully ugly, she loved nonetheless, and felt that if he would not grow in beauty then he should have the gift of the Awen to compensate. Upon completion of this potion, three drops sprang out and landed upon Gwion Bach's thumb. Gwion then placed his thumb in his mouth to soothe his burns resulting in Gwion's enlightenment. Out of fear of what Cerridwen would do to him, Gwion fled and eventually transformed into a piece of grain before being consumed by Cerridwen. However, this resulted in Cerridwen becoming impregnated with the seed and upon giving birth, she could not bring herself to kill the baby Gwion. She instead cast him into the ocean in a large leather bag, where he was found by Elffin, who named him Taliesin.

According to these texts Taliesin was the foster-son of Elffin ap Gwyddno, who gave him the name Taliesin, meaning "radiant brow", and who later became a king in Ceredigion, Wales. The legend states that he was then raised at his court in Aberdyfi and that at the age of 13, he visited King Maelgwn Gwynedd, Elffin's uncle, and correctly prophesied the manner and imminence of Maelgwn's death. A number of medieval poems attributed to Taliesin allude to the legend but these postdate the historical poet's floruit considerably.

The introduction to Gwyneth Lewis and Rowan Williams's translation of The Book of Taliesin suggests that later Welsh writers came to see Taliesin as a sort of shamanic figure. The poetry ascribed to him in this collection shows how he not only can channel other entities (such as the Awen) in these poems, but that the authors of these poems can in turn channel Taliesin himself in creating the poems that they ascribe to him. This creates a collectivist, rather than individualistic, sense of identity; no human is simply one human, humans are part of nature (rather than opposed to it), and all things in the cosmos can ultimately be seen to be connected through the creative spirit of the Awen.

The idea that he was a bard at the court of King Arthur dates back at least to the tale of Culhwch and Olwen, perhaps a product of the 11th century. It is elaborated upon in modern English poetry, such as Tennyson's Idylls of the King and Charles Williams' Taliessin Through Logres. But the historical Taliesin's career can be shown to have fallen in the last half of the 6th century, while historians who argue for Arthur's existence date his victory at Mons Badonicus in the years on either side of AD 500; the Annales Cambriae offer the date of c. 539 for his death or disappearance in the Battle of Camlann, only a few years earlier than the date of 542 found in the Historia Regum Britanniae. Taliesin also appears as a companion of Bran the Blessed in this era, by which time he was clearly perceived as a legendary figure who existed in many different times.

Taliesin appears as Telgesinus in Geoffrey of Monmouth's Latin poem Vita Merlini, in which he is a learned companion of Merlin. In Wace's Roman de Brut, he appears as Teleusin, a prophet who foretells the birth of Christ.

A manuscript in the hand of 18th-century literary forger Iolo Morganwg claimed he was the son of Saint Henwg of Llanhennock; but this is contrary to other tradition. In it he is said to have been educated in the school of Catwg, at Llanfeithin, in Glamorgan, which the historian Gildas also attended. Captured as a youth by Irish pirates while fishing at sea, he is said to have escaped by using a wooden buckler for a boat; he landed at the fishing weir of Elffin, one of the sons of Urien (all medieval Welsh sources, however, make Elffin the son of Gwyddno Garanhir). Urien made him Elffin's instructor, and gave Taliesin an estate. But once introduced to the court of the warrior-chief Taliesin became his foremost bard, followed him in his wars, and wrote of his victories.

== Influence ==
Modern Welsh poet John Davies of Denbighshire (1841–1894) took the bardic name of Taliesin Hiraethog. The American architect Frank Lloyd Wright, whose mother, Anna Lloyd Jones, was born in Wales, named his Wisconsin home and studio Taliesin and his home and studio near Scottsdale, Arizona Taliesin West.

Susan Kare, the typographer and graphic designer who developed the first set of fonts for the early Macintosh, created a dingbat font called Taliesin that shipped with the update disk for System 2 in 1985. Taliesin is relatively obscure compared to its more well-known counterpart Cairo, the symbol font that featured Apple's iconic dogcow logo. It is not clear why the font shares a name with the British poet, having been the only one of the set that does not bear the name of a "world class city" (Chicago, San Francisco, Toronto, etc.). As it contains several glyphs of buildings, furniture, and other aspects of architecture, landscaping, and interior design, however, it has been theorized that Taliesin was also named in homage to Frank Lloyd Wright's aforementioned studio and estate of same name.

=== Literature ===
As early as the 12th century bards of the Welsh princes adopted the persona of Taliesin to make prophetic and legendary claims for the source of their inspiration or awen as well as those poems which can be attributed directly to them. So some of the poems in the Book of Taliesin have been attributed to bards who saw themselves as working within the tradition of a legendary bard whose poems could be re-worked or re-imagined, giving rise to the prose tale in which some of these poems are embedded. Much of the academic work done on these poems focuses on attempting to separate poems by the original bard and later poets imaginatively taking on his mantle.

His name was used, spelled as Taliessin, in Alfred, Lord Tennyson's Idylls of the King. He is a character in Thomas Love Peacock's satirical romantic 1829 novel The Misfortunes of Elphin where he is discovered as a baby floating in a coracle by Elphin (Elfin) who is fishing. In the 1951 novel Porius, by John Cowper Powys, he is depicted as a politically astute court bard who is accomplished in both cookery and poetry.

He also makes an appearance in a number of works of modern commercial fiction that blend history and Arthurian legend, including quite a lengthy appearance in Bernard Cornwell's Warlord Chronicles and Guy Gavriel Kay's The Fionavar Tapestry. In Stephen R. Lawhead's The Pendragon Cycle, he is most notable in the first book, eponymously named Taliesin, in which he is depicted as Merlin's father. In M. K. Hume's King Arthur trilogy, he's depicted as Merlin's firstborn son. Gillian Bradshaw uses him as a stand-in for Merlin in her Arthurian trilogy, followed by Marion Zimmer Bradley in her bestselling retelling The Mists of Avalon. He is also a central character in Moonheart, an urban fantasy novel by Charles de Lint, and appears as the chief bard of the Kingdom of Prydain in the children's novels of Lloyd Alexander which are based on the Welsh Mabinogion. The historical novel Radiant Brow – The Epic of Taliesin by H. Catherine Watling is based on "The Tale of Taliesin" and the poetry contained in The Book of Taliesin. In the young adult fiction series The Dark Is Rising Sequence by British author Susan Cooper, he guides young protagonists Will Stanton and Bran Davies through the Lost Land in the final book, Silver on the Tree. Taliesin's harp-tuning key makes an appearance in "A String in the Harp" by Nancy Bond, a time-travel story set in Wales. The key gives Peter Morgan, the main protagonist, the ability to see visions of Taliesin's life.

In Charles Williams' unfinished series of Arthurian poems, found in Taliessin Through Logres and The Region of the Summer Stars, Taliesin is the central character, Arthur's bard and Captain of Horse, and the head of a companionship dedicated to Christian Charity in Camelot.

He is character in Traci Harding's Chosen series starting with The Ancient Future Trilogy where he is an immortal time traveler trying to help the human soul mind evolution advance.

=== Music ===
The Norwegian classical composer Martin Romberg wrote a concerto for alto saxophone and orchestra in eight parts after the tale named "The Tale of Taliesin". The concerto was premiered in 2009 by Akademische Orchestervereinigung Göttingen, with the Norwegian saxophonist Ola Asdahl Rokkones as a soloist. The work has since been published at Éditions Billaudot, Paris and played by Mittelsächsische Philharmonie, The Saint-Petersburg Northern Synfonia Orchestra and Nizhny Novgorod Philharmonic Orchestra, the two latter being conducted by Fabio Mastrangelo.

In modern music, Deep Purple's second studio album was named The Book of Taliesyn in honour of the bard. A track on the album Softs by Canterbury prog-rock band Soft Machine is titled "The Tale of Taliesin". Paul Roland's 2006 album Re-Animator contains a song about the bard titled "Taliesin". There is a Dungeon synth band from Germany named Taliesin The Bard. The Song "Spiral Castle" by the American Epic Heavy Metal band Manilla Road uses Taliesin as the fictional narrator of the lyrics. The 2024 album by MGMT, Loss of Life begins with a spoken word piece which is an excerpt from The Book of Taliesin.

== Sources ==
- Ford, Patrick K. 1977. The Mabinogi and Other Medieval Welsh Tales Berkeley: University of California Press.
- Ford, Patrick K. 1992. Ystoria Taliesin University of Wales Press: Cardiff.
- Ford, Patrick K. 1999. The Celtic Poets: Songs and Tales from Early Ireland and Wales Ford and Bailie: Belmont, Mass.
- Haycock, Marged 2007. Legendary Poems from the Book of Taliesin (CMCS, Aberystwyth)
- Haycock, Marged. 1997. "Taliesin's Questions" Cambrian Medieval Celtic Studies 33 (Summer): 19–79.
- Haycock, Marged. 1987. "'Some talk of Alexander and some of Hercules': three early medieval poems from the 'Book of Taliesin." Cambridge Medieval Celtic Studies 13 (1987): 7–38.
- Haycock, Marged. 1987–88. "Llyfr Taliesin," National Library of Wales Journal 25: 357–86.
- Haycock, Marged. 1983–84. "Preiddeu Annwn and the Figure of Taliesin" Studia Celtica18/19: 52–78.
- Koch, John T. and John Carey. 2003.The Celtic Heroic Age 3rd ed. Celtic Studies Publishing: Malden, Mass.
- Koch, John T. "De sancto Iudicaelo rege Historia and Its Implications for the Welsh Taliesin" in Nagy, Joseph Falaky and Jones, Leslie Ellen (eds.) 2005. Heroic Poets and Poetic Heroes in Celtic Tradition: A Festschrift for Patrick K. Ford, Dublin, 247–262
- Koch, John T. "Waiting for Gododdin: Thoughts on Taliesin and Iudic-Hael, Catreath, and unripe time in Celtic studies" in Woolf, Alex (ed.) 2013, Beyond the Gododdin: Dark Age Scotland in Medieval Wales, St. Andrews, 177–204
- Williams, Ifor. 1960. Canu Taliesin. Translated into English by J. E. Caerwyn Williams as The Poems of Taliesin Dublin Institute for Advanced Studies: Dublin. (first edition 1967, reprinted 1975, 1987)
- Williams, Ifor. 1944. Lectures on Early Welsh poetry. Dublin: DIAS
- English Writers: An Attempt Towards a History of English Literature, Henry Morley, William Hall Griffin, Published by Cassell & Company, limited, 1887
- McCarter, Robert (1997). Frank Lloyd Wright. London: Phaidon Press. ISBN 978-0-7148-3148-0.
