= Elis Gruffydd =

Welsh chronicler

Elis Gruffydd (1490–1552), sometimes known as "The soldier of Calais", was a Welsh chronicler, transcriber, and translator. He is known foremost for his massive chronicle Cronicl o Wech Oesoedd (Chronicle of the Six Ages), which covers the history of the world from the beginning of Adam and Eve up to the year 1552 (year of completion) and contains the earliest text of the Tale of Taliesin. He is also well known for his eyewitness account of England's 1543 war with France in his journal transcribed in Elis Gruffydd and the 1544 'Enterprise' of Paris and Boulogue. His presence on the battlefield has given insight into the development of protests against the campaign. Thomas Jones says "despite his long years of service in France and London, [Gruffydd] was deeply interested in the oral traditions and written literature of his native land. He quotes Welsh englynion and proverbs, records a few folk-tales, and transcribes Welsh texts from such MSS as he had at his disposal". Gruffydd is an excellent source in uncovering lost and obscure traditions and he serves as a harmoniser for Welsh traditions appearing in different ages by the same poet, such as Merlin and Taliesin.

== Life ==
Elis Gruffydd was born in Upper Gronant in the parish of Llanasa, Flintshire. More famously Elis Gruffydd began his life in Flintshire, Wales as the younger son of a cadet of a gentry's family. At a young age he inherited 24 acres of land from his uncle Siôn ap Dafydd. It has been assumed that his family was related to the Mostyns, a family of considerable wealth and influence during the era. In 1510 he travelled across the border and joined the English army, fighting in Holland and Spain. He may have been attracted to London because of the Tudor dynasty, whose closest Welsh cousins were the Mostyns and who offered opportunities for the Welsh. His neighbour Sir Huw Conwy of Botryddan was already high in the royal service and worked as the treasurer of Calais from 1492 to 1517.

By 1518 he began working for Sir Robert Wingfield, a gentleman from Suffolk, mostly likely to solve his financial issues. The Wingfield family was one of the most distinguished families of government servants under the early Tudors. In 1520 he was working at the Wingfield home in Calais, where he witnessed the Battle of the Golden Field of the Cloth. From his experience here Gruffydd left detailed soldier-eye descriptions on the conditions and men on this campaign. He accompanied Wingfield on various diplomatic missions abroad, most notably around France, which accounts for his extensive knowledge on French culture and history. On an expedition in 1523, Gruffydd accompanies Wingfield to London, giving vivid descriptions of Thomas Wolsey in the Court of Star Chamber.

Between 1524 and 1529/1530, he was residing in London as caretaker of Wingfield Place. The nature of Gruffydd's work was never revealed. In his own Chronicle he describes duties that took him outside London: to Essex and Kent in 1525 and to Poplar in 1527. During his stay in London he observed many political figures and witnessed events at the Court of Star Chamber. At Wingfield in 1527, he produced his earliest surviving manuscript, the "Book of Elis Gruffydd" (Cardiff MS. 3,4; olim MS. 5 (Note: Nicolas Jacobs explains that "(Cardiff) MS. 3,4" "is the current shelfmark of the 'Book of Elis Gruffydd', described by J. G. Evans under shelfmark Cardiff 5".) / Phillipps 10823) which featured a collection of prose and poetry based loosely of the late medieval tradition. On 27 January 1529 (or 1530), Gruffydd travelled back to Calais as a professional soldier (on payroll to protect the garrison), joining his master Sir Robert Wingfield was serving as deputy governor of the French city. Henceforth he was known as "The soldier of Calais". Here he wrote two more works called Castell yr Iechyd, or The Fortress of Health, which was a collection of Welsh translations of medical works, and Cronicl o Wech Oesoedd, Gruffydd's immense chronicle of the world. This chronicle was written in Welsh, despite his long residence in England and France, consisting in large part of translations and adaptations of English, French, or Latin sources. The fact that he includes in the work a version of Ystoria Taliesin, is highly significant for medievalists, as this is the earliest surviving copy of the legend of Taliesin's birth and acquisition of the gift of vision. Though he recorded it in the sixteenth century, Gruffydd gives evidence of earlier sources, hinting toward a ninth-century origination date.

He spent the remainder of his life in Calais transcribing various manuscripts, mostly likely from the Wingfield family library. He lived as a bachelor soldier and married a Calais girl named Elizabeth Manfielde. He inherited some property through her and they had two children together. As the Protestant wave swept Europe, Gruffydd converted from Catholicism and became a convinced Protestant some time around the 1540s. Deeply influenced by Thomas Cromwell, Gruffydd was the first Welsh Protestant to leave a record of his religious views. The exact date of his death is unknown, but the last date in his chronicle is 1552. It is, however, generally believed that he was still present in Calais when the city was retaken in 1558.

== Chronicler ==
Although Elis Gruffydd spent the majority of his life as a soldier and an administrative officer, it was his work as a chronicler, transcriber, and translator that made him known. Though he was a soldier for the Tudor empire, he showed a continual interest in the welfare of Wales. His career as a military officer paralleled to his career as a writer, inspiring him to create an English style chronicle for his own Welshmen.

Gruffydd's most important work was his famous chronicle of the world, Chronicle of Six Ages of the World. Completed around 1552, the some 2,400-folio page work is divided into two parts. The first, NLW Manuscript 5276D describes the history of the world in six ages from Creation to the Christian Age. The second portion, labelled NLW Manuscript 3054D tells the history of England from the reign of William the Conqueror in 1066 up to its published date in 1552. This part of the manuscript gave a look into Gruffydd's own life, as well as the lives of other Welsh people who emigrated from London to Calais. It also showed Welsh attitudes toward the Tudor kings Henry VII and Henry VIII, giving insight into Welsh history in an English cultural context. The work gave extensive narratives in written Welsh language, a trait scarcely seen before. Gruffydd commonly used himself as a source, which became evident further into the text. Frequently referencing his own experiences with Sir Robert Wingfield, he records important events such as meetings between King Henry VIII of England and King Francis I of France on the Field of Cloth of Gold, as well as trials within the Court of Star Chamber. The immense document contains the earliest version of the Taliesin Saga (Hanes Taliesin or Ystoria Taliesin) as well the earliest prose tale of Gwion Bach. It also contains a version of the story of Owain Glyndŵr, the [Story of] Huail ap Caw [and Arthur], a version of "The Story of Myrddin the Wild", the story of Maelgwn Gwynedd's Wife and Ring, and the Story of Llywelyn ab Iorwerth and Cynwrig Goch of Trefriw (Hanes Llywelyn ap Iorwerth a Cynwrig Goch o Drefriw). This document is one of the largest works ever written in the Welsh language, as well as Gruffydd's last work. Today it resides at the National Library of Wales, (Note: Hunter (1995) and Hunter (2023), pp. 3–4) in manuscripts NLW MS. 5276D and NLW MS. 3054D (olim Mostyn 158).

Elis Gruffydd's perhaps second most important work was a journal he kept during Henry VIII's war in France. Elis Gruffydd and the 1544 'Enterprises' of Paris and Boulogne was transcribed by M. Bryn Davies. This journal gives remarkable detail into the military, social, and political life of war seen from the viewpoint of a soldier, a perspective rarely observed. As a member of the "Poor Bloody Infantry", Gruffydd revealed sympathies with the sufferings of the soldiers rather than their commanders, who he regularly barraged with harsh criticism. His narrative showed his opinionated, well-informed, and experienced view of the world.

== Works ==
- "Book of Elis Gruffydd" [1527] (Cardiff MS. 3,4; olim MS. 5)
- The Fortress of Health (Castell yr Iechlyd) [1548/9] (Cwrtmawr MS. 1)
- Chronicle of the Six Ages (Cronicl o Wech Oesoedd) [1552] (NLW MS. 5276D, NLW MS. 3054D olim Mostyn 158)

=== Some contents of the chronicle ===
- The Tale of Hercules (Ystoria Erkwlf) (Note: MS. 5276D, fols. 46a–68a.)
- "The Tale of the Bare Ship"/(or "Restless Ship", "Rudderless Ship", Ystori'r Llong Foel) (Note: MS. 5276D, fols. 81b–85b.)
- The Twelve Matters of Belief (Deuddeg Pwnc y Ffdd) (Note: MS. 5276D, fols. 236a–339vb.)
- "[Story of] Huail Son of Caw and Arthur" (Chwedl Huail ap Caw ac Arthur) (Note: MS. 5276D, fols. 334a–335b)
- Story of Merlin/Myrddin (Ysdori Merthin) based on Vulgate. (Note: MS. 5276D, fols. 303b–305a)
- Merlin prophesying before Vortigern (Note: MS. 5276D, fols. 309a–317b)
- Prophecies which Myrddin made to Arthur (wnaeth Merddin i Arthur) (Note: MS. 5276D, fols. 347a–)
  - a) The Three-fold Death Prophecy (Chwedl Myrddin a'r Farwolaeth Driphlyg) (Note: MS. 5276D, fols. 347a–348a)
  - b) Unnamed prophecy to Arthur (Note: MS. 5276D, fols. 348a–349b)
  - c) Myrddin’s Composition to the Lily (Gwaith Merddin i’r Lili) (Note: MS. 5276D, fols. 349b–350a)
  - d) Myrddin’s Composition to the Fleur-de-lys (Gwaith Merddin j’r Fflwrdylis) (Note: MS. 5276D, fols. 350a–350b)
  - e) Myrddin’s Composition to the Cockerel (Gwaith Merddin j’r Keiliog) (Note: MS. 5276D, fols. 350b–352a)
  - f) "Time and signs by Myrddin Emrys [Merlinus Ambrosius] and the spirit" (Amser ac arwyddion o waith Merddin Emrys a’r ysbrudd). (Note: MS. 5276D, fols. 352a–353b)
  - g) "Myrddin’s Prophecy concerning the last six kings who would be over this island" (Proffwydoliaeth Merddin am y chwe brenin diwethaf a fyddai ar yr ynys hon) (Note: MS. 5276D, fols. 353b–356a)
- "[Of] the Death of Myrddin" (Marwolaeth Myrdin/O Varuolaeth Merddin) (Note: MS. 5276D, fols. 356a–358a)
- "The Story of Gwion Bach" (Ysdori Gwion Bach) (Note: MS. 5276D, fols. 358a–359a)
- The Tale of Taliesin (Ystoria Taliesin) (Note: MS. 5276D, fols. 369a–381b)
- Prophecies of the poet Heinin (Note: MS. 5276D, fols. 381b–383b)
- "The Story of Merlin and the Five Dreams of Gwenddydd" (Note: This composite title given by Jones ed. (1959) to the two tracts he edited and translated, pp. 334–345) (Myrddin a Phum Breuddwyd Gwenddydd)
  - "The Story of Myrddin the Wild" (Ysdori Merddin Wylld (Note: MS. 5276D, fols. 400b–402a, Welsh title is as given by Jones ed. (1959), p. 319, item 8.))
  - "Five Dreams of Gwenddydd" (Note: MS. 5276D, fols. MS. 5276D, fols. 402a–404b, No Welsh title for Jones ed. (1959), p. 319, item 9. The heading given in the edited text is "Y Breuddwydd Kyntla", "The First Dream".)
- Various questions and addresses and conversations between Myrddin and Gwenddydd (Ymrauaylion gwesdiwne ac areithie ac ymddiddannau rhwng Merddin a Gwenddydd) (Note: MS. 5276D, fols. 404b–405a)
  - a) "Gwenddydd’s Questions" (Gouynion Gwenddydd) (Note: MS. 5276D, fols. 405a–406a)
  - b) 4 stanzas beginning "Hoyan borckellan o borchell.." (Note: MS. 5276D, fols. 406a–407a)
  - c) 15 stanzas each beginning "Orddod bron goruod.." (Note: MS. 5276D, fols. 407a–411a)
  - d) Cyfoesi Myrddin a Gwenddydd ei Chwaer (Note: MS. 5276D, fols. 411a–412a)
- Maelgwn's Wife and the Ring (Gwraig Maelgwn a'r Fodrwy (Note: MS. 5276D, fols. 367b–368b))
- The History of Llywelyn ap Iorwerth and Cynwrig from Trefriw Red (Hanes Llywelyn ap Iorwerth a Cynwrig Goch o Drefriw (Note: Mostyn 158, fols. 90–91))

== Sources ==
- Brewer, D.S. (2005). The Fortunes of King Arthur. Trowbridge: Cromwell Press. ISBN 1-84384-061-8.
- Davies, M. Bryn (2003). Elis Gruffydd and the 1544 ‘Enterprises’ of Paris and Boulogne. Surrey: The Pike and Shot Society. ISBN 1-902768-20-5.
- Ford, Patrick K. (1976). "The Death of Merlin in the Chronicle of Elis Gruffydd". Viator: Medieval and Renaissance Studies. Vol. 7. Univ of California Press. pp. 380–390. ISBN 0-520-03136-9.
- Ford, Patrick K. (1992). Ystoria Taliesin. University of Wales Press. ISBN 0708310923.
- Ford, Patrick K., tr., ed. (2023). Tales of Merlin, Arthur, and the Magic Arts: From the Welsh Chronicle of the Six Ages of the World [by Elis Gruffydd]. Introduction by Jerry Hunter. Univ of California Press. ISBN 9780520390263.
  - Hunter, Thomas Gerald [Gerry] (2023), "Introduction", in Ford (ed.), Tales of Merlin
- Jones, Thomas [in Welsh] (1952–1954). "Disgrifiad Elis Gruffudd o Ymgyrch Dug Suffolk yn Ffrainc yn 1523". The Bulletin of the Board of Celtic Studies. 15: 267–279. hdl:2027/mdp.39015068974156.
- Jones, Thomas [in Welsh] (1954–1956). "Chwedl Myrddin a'r Farwolaeth Driphlyg yng Nghronicl Elis Gruffudd". The Bulletin of the Board of Celtic Studies. 16: 184–188. hdl:2027/mdp.39015068974156.
- Jones, Thomas [in Welsh] (1959). "The story of Myrddin and the five dreams of Gwenddydd in the chronicle of Elis Gruffudd". Études celtiques. 8 (2): 315–345. doi:10.3406/ecelt.1959.1317. (html text@maryjones)
- Jones, Thomas [in Welsh] (1960). "A Welsh Chronicler in Tudor England". Cylchgrawn Hanes Cymru [Welsh History Review]. 1 (1): 3–16.
- Lloyd-Morgan, Ceridwen (2005). "Welsh Tradition in Calais: Elis Gruffydd and his Biography of King Arthur". In Lacy, Norris J. (ed.). The Fortunes of King Arthur. Arthurian studies 64. Boydell Press. pp. 77–90. ISBN 9781843840619.
- Phillips, Gervase. (2001). “To Cry ‘Home! Home!’: Mutiny, Morale, and Indiscipline in Tudor Armies”. The Journal of Military History Vol. 65, No. 2: 313–332.
