= John Davies (Taliesin Hiraethog) =

Welsh poet

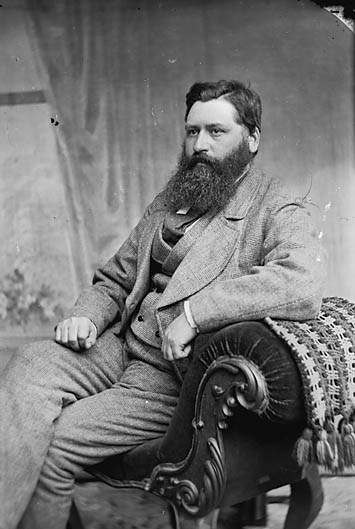
Photograph of John Davies (Taliesin Hiraethog) by John Thomas, c. 1875

John Davies (bardic name: Taliesin Hiraethog; 2 October 1841 – 20 March 1894) was a Welsh farmer and poet. He was born in the Cerrigydrudion area of Denbighshire. He was educated at the school in Pentre-llyn-cymer, and then at Cerrigydrudion, where he was taught by his cousin Huw Huws. Completing his education, he returned to farm his parents' farm, Creigiau'r Bleiddiau. He remained there until his mother's death, when he moved, and for a period worked as a bailiff for C. S. Mainwaring of Llaethwryd, Cerrigydrudion. On marrying, he then moved to Shotton Farm, Flintshire, but following the death of his wife and their son there, he married again and moved to a small farm near Denbigh. When his daughter Alwen died in 1891, age 17, he was much affected, and his own health rapidly deteriorated.

He died in March 1894 and was buried at Whitchurch, Denbigh.

His writings include a number of poems in classical metres, and some free verse, such as "Pryddest Llywarch Hen" and "Rhieingerdd Elwy ac Alwen", he also wrote a novel, Y Sesiwn yng Nghymru ("On the Great Sessions of Wales"), which won an eisteddfod prize. A number of his poems were written for the Voelas family, and he may have been considered their household bard.
