= The White Snake =

German fairy tale

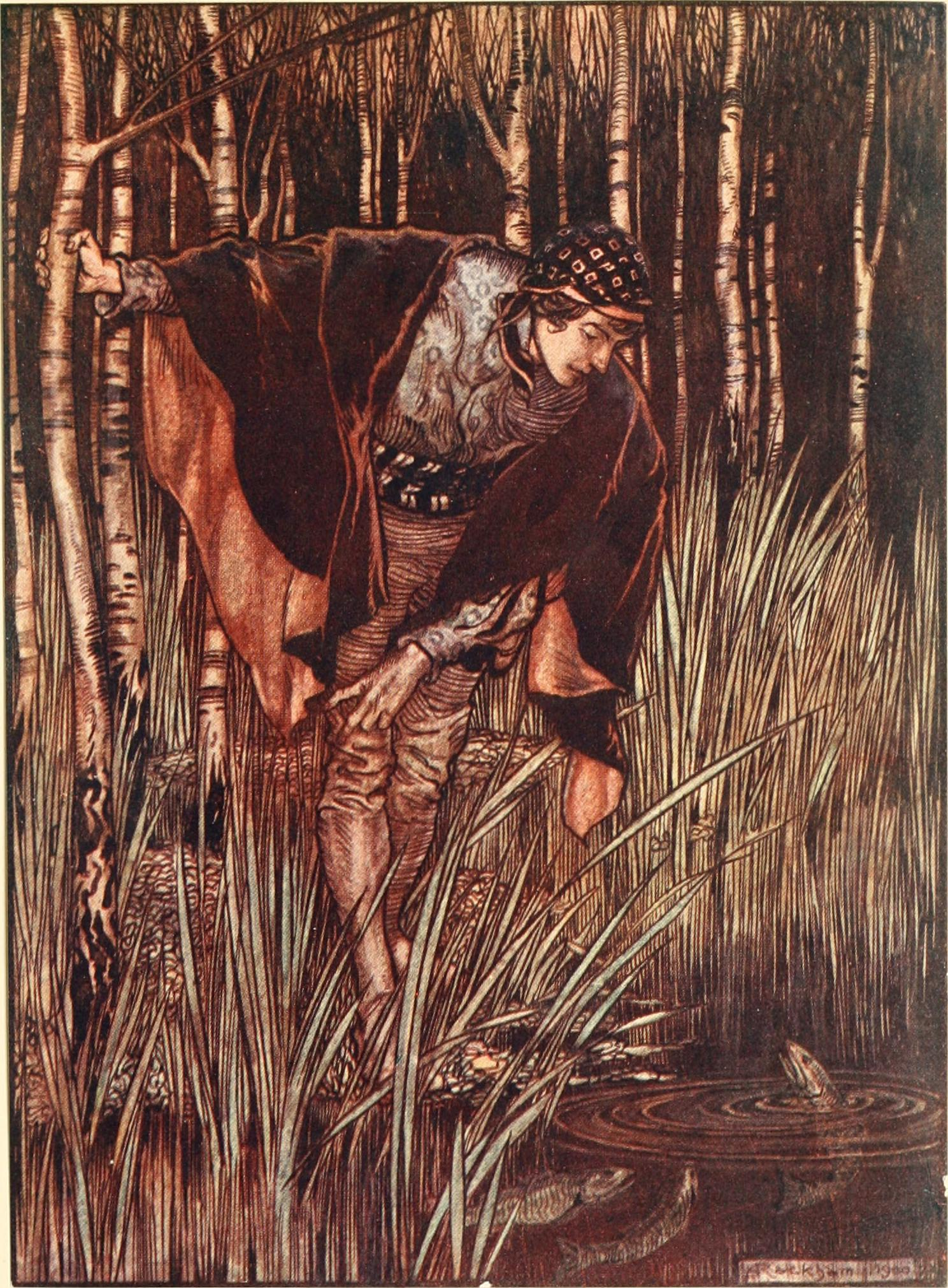
- 1916 illustration by Arthur Rackham

Folk tale
- Name: The White Snake
- Aarne–Thompson grouping: ATU 673
- Country: Germany
- Published in: Grimm's Fairy Tales

"The White Snake" (German: Die weiße Schlange) is a German fairy tale collected by the Brothers Grimm and published in Grimm's Fairy Tales (KHM 17). It is of Aarne–Thompson type 673, and includes an episode of type 554 ("The Grateful Animals").

In the tale, a servant bites a white snake and gains the ability to communicate with animals. He rescues animals in distress, and each of them promises to return the favour. Later, the servant has to complete a dangerous task to marry a princess. Once he completes the task, the princess makes a number of additional demands. He always relies on help from his animal friends. His final task is to bring an apple from the Tree of Life to his bride.

== Summary ==
A wise King receives a covered dish every evening. A young servant is intrigued one night when he retrieves the King's dish and discovers a coiled white snake under the cover. The servant takes a small bite and discovers that he can now understand and communicate with animals.

Shortly afterwards the servant is accused of stealing the Queen's ring. He is given one day to prove his innocence or submit to punishment. After having given up, he sits awaiting his demise when he overhears a goose complaining about a ring stuck in her throat. The servant leaps up, grabs the goose and hurries to the kitchen, where the cook slits the goose's neck and reveals the missing gold ring. The King apologizes and offers the servant land and riches. The servant declines, accepting only a little gold and a horse on which to see the world.

On his journey to another town in another kingdom, the servant first encounters a number of animals in distress, including three fish out of water, ants at risk of being trodden upon, and starving raven fledglings in a nest. In each case the servant heeds the call for help, and in each case the grateful animals respond with "I will remember and return the favour".

In the next town, the servant learns that the King has announced that he wishes to marry off his daughter, but any suitor must agree to complete an arduous task to the end or be put to death. After one glimpse of the beautiful girl, the young man agrees. The King tosses a golden ring into the sea and tells the young man to retrieve it. He also adds that the young man must either bring the ring back, drown while getting the ring, or be drowned upon returning without it. However, the three fish appear, carrying a mussel with the King's ring inside.

Astonished, the King agrees to the marriage of his daughter to the servant. However, the princess sets him upon another task of refilling sacks of grain that she has spilled in the grass, because she has found out that he is not a noble and thus not her social equal. The young man is discouraged because he believes it impossible to gather all of the grain from the ground, and he lies down and falls asleep. When he wakes, he is surprised to find all the sacks are now refilled, with not one grain missing. The ant king had all of the ants working the entire night to fill them.

Still not satisfied, the princess sends the servant off to bring her an apple from the Tree of Life. The servant does not know where the Tree of Life stands, but he sets off anyway. After a long journey, he encounters the three raven fledglings, who have flown to the end of the world, where the Tree stands, and retrieved the apple for him. The servant takes the apple to the princess and shares it with her, and the two are happily married.

== Analysis ==
The tale is classified in the Aarne-Thompson-Uther Index as ATU 673, "The White Serpent's Flesh". The tale is part of a cycle of stories where the character comes to know the language of animals through the help of a serpent - in this case, by eating the flesh of a white serpent. The motif is well-known in Europe and frequently found in Central and Eastern Europe, but also in Scotland, Ireland, Scandinavia, in the Baltic countries and occasionally also outside Europe.

The motif of the mythical ring thrown away, swallowed by an animal and retrieved shortly after is also classified in the Aarne-Thompson-Uther Index as ATU-736A and originates from the ancient Greek tale of the Ring of Polycrates.

An early literary version is provided in the Icelandic Volsunga Saga (late 13th century) that describes how Sigurd slew the dragon Fafnir and learned the language of birds when tasting Fafnir's heart. Similarly, Saxo Grammaticus (Gesta Danorum, V.2.6-V.2.8, 12th c.) describes how Eric acquired eloquence and wisdom by eating the snake-infested stew his step-mother Kraka had prepared for his half-brother Roller. Further related medieval tales include the Welsh Hanes Taliesin, and the Irish Salmon of Knowledge.

== Adaptations ==
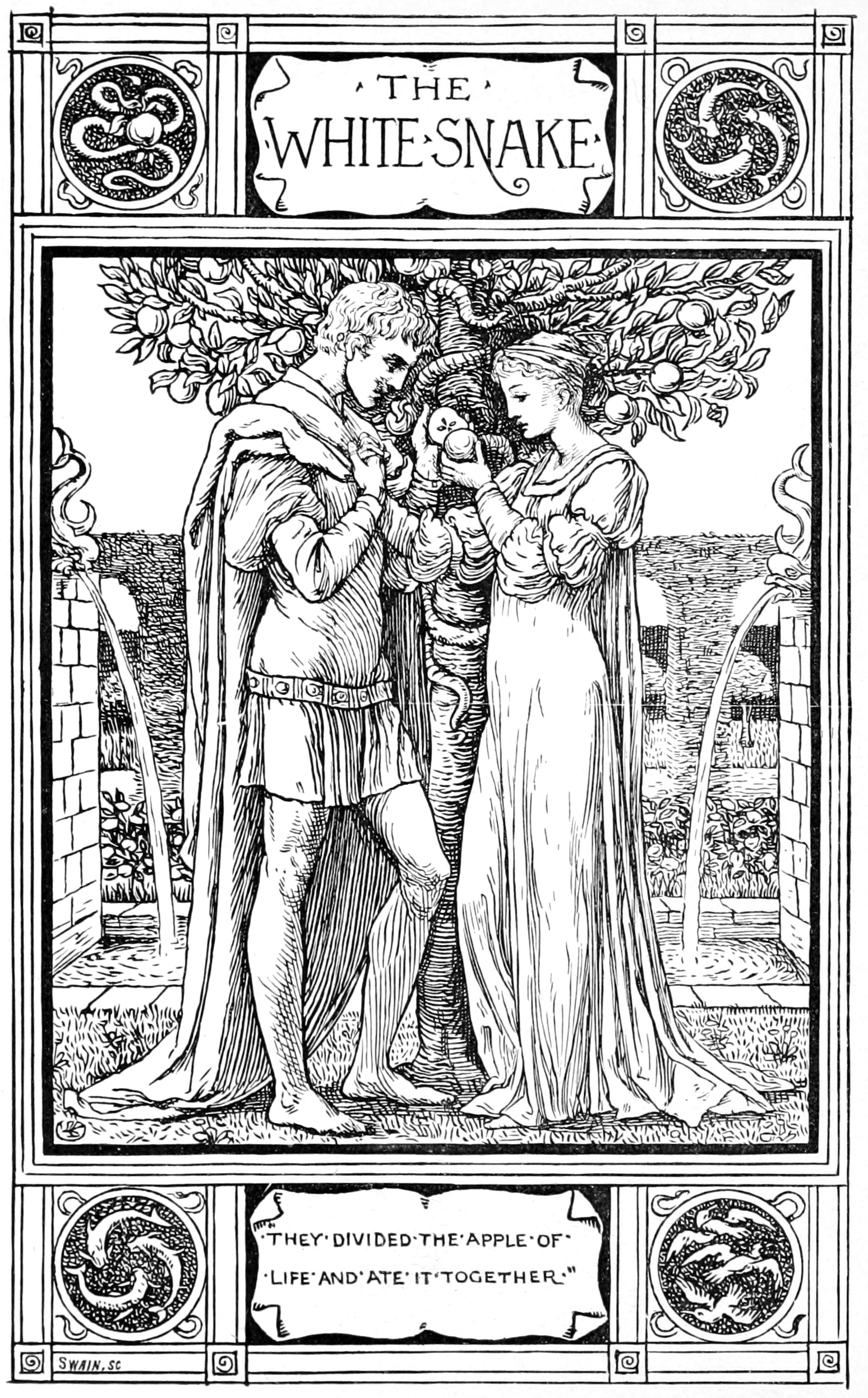
Illustration by Walter Crane, 1882

=== Literature ===
- Anne Sexton wrote an adaptation as a poem called "The White Snake" in her collection Transformations (1971), a book in which she re-envisions sixteen of the Grimm's Fairy tales.
- The King's Servant, a short story in Maud Lindsay's The Story-teller (1915), is "adapted with a free hand" from Grimm's "White Snake."

=== Film and television ===
- The titular white snake appears in the Czech children's TV series Arabela, where it enables both Princess Arabela and the evil magician Rumburak to understand the animal tongue.
