= Daniel Huws =

Welsh historian

Daniel Huws FLSW (born 1932) is the world's leading authority of the last hundred years on Welsh manuscripts, with contributions that are held to represent a significant advance on those of John Gwenogvryn Evans.

He is noted in particular for his studies of individual manuscripts, and these, alongside portraits of significant Renaissance collectors, made up his work Medieval Welsh Manuscripts, now recognised as the key academic text of this dimension of Wales' written history and culture. As of 2015, his work focuses on the history of Welsh manuscripts continuing up to 1800.

His work has also included other projects on Wales, including The Poets of the Princes [reference needed], The Poets of the Gentry [reference needed], Prose Texts from Manuscripts, and The Poems of Dafydd ap Gwilym. He has written on Welsh music, as well as publishing three volumes of poetry with Secker and Warburg and Faber and Faber. A university friend and associate of Ted Hughes, he has written a memoir of the poet.

He was awarded the Derek Allen Prize by the British Academy in 2006.

He was elected a Fellow of the Learned Society of Wales in 2011.

== Life ==
Huws was raised in London and Anglesey, and attended a school in Llangefni, going onto Bryanston School, before studying Archaeology and Anthropology at Peterhouse, Cambridge. He worked at the National Library of Wales between 1961 and 1992, and is also a member of the Welsh Academy. As a student, Huws became a close friend of Ted Hughes, and his 2010 Memories of Ted Hughes 1952–1963 chronicles his experiences of the poet at an early age, his circle at Cambridge, the development of his relationship with Sylvia Plath, and their later life in London. Huws and his wife unsuccessfully campaigned to prevent the closure of the Catholic church in the centre of Aberystwyth. His sister worked as an artist in Paris.

== Academic works ==
- Huws, Daniel (1986). "The texts: ii. The manuscripts". In Charles-Edwards, T. M.; Owen, Morfydd E.; Walters, D. B. (eds.). Lawyers and Laymen: studies in the history of law. Cardiff: University of Wales Press.
- Peniarth 28: darluniau o Lyfr Cyfraith Hywel Dda / Illustrations from a Welsh lawbook, Aberystwyth: National Library of Wales, 1988.
- Llyfr Aneirin: a facsimile, Aberystwyth: National Library of Wales, 1989.
- "Llyffr Gwyn Rhydderch". Cambridge Medieval Celtic Studies. 21: 1–37. 1991.
- Cardiff MSS: Summary Catalogue of the Manuscripts, Aberystwyth: National Library of Wales, 1994.
- Five Ancient Books of Wales, H. M. Chadwick Memorial Lectures 6, Cambridge: Department of Anglo-Saxon, Norse and Celtic, University of Cambridge, 1995.
- Medieval Welsh Manuscripts, Cardiff: University of Wales Press, 2000.
- Huws, Daniel (2000). "Descriptions of the Welsh manuscripts". In Charles-Edwards, T. M.; Owen, Morfydd E.; Russell, Paul (eds.). The Welsh King and his Court. Cardiff: University of Wales Press. pp. 415–24.
- Edrica Huws Patchworks / Clytweithiau Edrica Huws (co-editor) (Manaman, 2007)
- "From song to script in medieval Wales". Quaestio Insularis. 9: 1–16. 2008.
- Huws, Daniel (2011). "The Neath Abbey Breviate of Domesday". In Griffiths, Ralph A.; Schofield, Phillipp R. (eds.). Wales and the Welsh in the Middle Ages: essays presented to J. Beverley Smith. Cardiff: University of Wales Press. pp. 46–55. ISBN 9780708324462.

== Poetry ==
- Noth, Secker, 1972.
- The Quarry, Faber, 1999.

== Memoirs ==
- Memories of Ted Hughes, 1952–63, Five Leaves, 2010.

== Festschrift ==
- Jones, Tegwyn; Fryde, Edmund Boleslaw, eds. (1994). Ysgrifau a cherddi cyflwynedig i Daniel Huws / Essays and poems presented to Daniel Huws. Aberystwyth: National Library of Wales.
