= Elffin ap Gwyddno =

Character in Welsh mythology

The variant spelling 'Elphin' may refer to Saint Elphin, the town of Elphin, County Roscommon, Ireland or the Diocese of Elphin, cathedral in Sligo Town, Co. Sligo, Ireland. Elphin is also a village in Sutherland, Scotland.

In Welsh mythology, Elffin ap Gwyddno (Welsh, also Elphin) was a son of Gwyddno Garanhir, 'Lord of Ceredigion'. The earliest example of the name occurs in several of the mythological poems attributed to Taliesin in the Book of Taliesin. The date of their composition is uncertain but probably predates the Norman conquest. Several late medieval compositions refer to Elffin and Taliesin in more detail.

== Hanes Taliesin ==
The legend of Elffin's association with Taliesin is given at its fullest in the late medieval prose text Ystorya Taliesin, the earliest redaction of the tale known as Hanes Taliesin. In that tale Elffin was extremely unlucky. Gwyddno sent him to a salmon weir and had him fish. Instead of catching salmon, Elffin found a baby boy and called it Taliesin ("radiant brow"). Along the way back to his father, Taliesin, though still a baby, spoke in beautiful poetry.

A few years later, Maelgwn Gwynedd, king of Gwynedd, demanded that Elffin praise him and his court. Elffin refused, claiming Taliesin was a better bard and his wife a more virtuous woman than anyone the King had in his court. Taliesin knew what was happening, because he was a seer, and told Elffin's wife. Maelgwn's son Rhun went to Elffin's house to seduce his wife and prove Elffin's claims weren't true. Rhun got her drunk. When she passed out, Rhun tried to take her wedding ring off to prove her unfaithfulness; since the ring wouldn't come off, he cut off her finger. When King Maelgwn attempted to show the finger to Elffin, he pointed out that his wife cut her fingernails more often than the owner of the finger, had servants to knead dough and never had any under her nails, and her ring was loose on her finger, and that one was tight.

Maelgwn demanded Taliesin come to his court to prove the other claim wrong. Taliesin gave twenty minutes for both himself and the King's bards to come up with an epic. The royal bards couldn't do it. When it came Taliesin's time, he caused a massive wind to rattle the castle. Frightened, Maelgwn sent for Elffin. Taliesin's next song caused Elffin's chains to detach.

Then Maelgwn challenged the pair to a horse race. Taleisin arrived the next day with an old, weak horse. As each of the king's horses passed him at the very start of the race, Taliesin touched its rump with a twig of holly. When they had all passed, he dropped his hat to the ground. When the king's horses came back, right before the finish line, they stopped at the holly twigs Taliesin had laid there, and began to dance. Taliesin's old horse strolled back in quite a bit later and won the race.

== Later literary references ==
Thomas Love Peacock's novel of 1829 The Misfortunes of Elphin relates much of Elfin's story. The novel is in part a satire of contemporary British life and in part a playful and ironic version of Welsh legend. The novel includes the discovery of Taleisin as a baby and the attempted rape of Elfin's wife by Rhun - which is considerably toned down for a comic novel.
