= Nancy Bond =

American author of children's literature

Nancy Barbara Bond
- Born: January 8, 1945 (age 81); Bethesda, Maryland, U.S.
- Education: Mount Holyoke College (BA); Aberystwyth University
- Occupations: Children's author; librarian; professor
- Writing career
- Subjects: children's fantasy, historical fiction
- Notable work: A String in the Harp
- Notable awards: Newbery Honor, Tir na n-Og Award

Nancy Barbara Bond (born January 8, 1945) is an American author of children's literature. In 1977 her first book, A String in the Harp, was fantasy novel with an element of folklore, set in West Wales. It received a Newbery honor and the Welsh Tir na n-Og Award, and remains in print.

== Life ==
Nancy Barbara Bond was born January 8, 1945, in Bethesda, Maryland, and grew up near Concord, Massachusetts. When Bond was eight, the family spent a year in London while her father was on a Fulbright Scholarship. She graduated from high school in Concord, then received her B. A. in English literature from Mount Holyoke College in 1966. In 1972 she received a graduate degree from the College of Librarianship in Aberystwyth, Wales.

Bond's "three greatest interests as long as she can remember have been natural history, books – especially children's books – and Britain."

Bond worked in Boston for Houghton Mifflin publishing from 1966 to 1967, then for two years in London in the promotions department of Oxford University Press. She went on to be an assistant librarian for the Lincoln, Massachusetts Public Library from 1969 to 1971. On returning from her year in Wales, Bond was looking for a job and began to write her first book, which she set in Wales. She became head librarian in the Gardner, Massachusetts, library in 1973.

Bond's children's novel A String in the Harp appeared in 1976. Set mainly in Borth, near Aberystwyth, where Bond had attended college, it tells the story of an American family spending a year in Wales after the death of their mother. As Bond put it to an interviewer, "Each of my stories is tied firmly to a geographical setting, which plays an important part in the development of the book." She served as an administrative assistant in the Massachusetts Audubon Society from 1976 to 1977. Her second book, The Best of Enemies, followed in 1978. From 1979 to 2001 Bond taught at the Simmons College Center for the Study of Children's Literature. Since then she has worked as a bookseller and continued as a writer in Concord.

== Critical reception ==
'The String in the Harp was named a Newbery Honor Book, and a Boston Globe-Horn Book Honor Book in 1977. It received the International Reading Association Award and the Welsh Arts Council's Tir na n-Og for the best English-language children's book about Wales, which called it "a most impressive first novel [in which] Bond deftly blends fantasy and realism...." The University of Chicago Guide to Children's Literature also praised the characters' growing maturity throughout the story. It has been several times reissued and remains in print.

Her fourth book, The Voyage Begun, won the Boston Globe-Horn Book Award. Her fifth, A Place to Come Back To, was named an ALA Best Books for Young Adults, and the Booklist Editor's Choice.

== Selected works ==
- A String in the Harp, Atheneum (New York, NY) 1976
- The Best of Enemies, Atheneum (New York, NY) 1978
- Country of Broken Stone, Atheneum (New York, NY) 1980
- The Voyage Begun, Atheneum (New York, NY) 1981
- A Place to Come Back To, Atheneum (New York, NY) 1984
- Another Shore, Macmillan (New York, NY) 1988
- Truth To Tell, McElderry Books (New York, NY) 1994
- The Love of Friends, McElderry Books (New York, NY) 1997
