= Gwyddno Garanhir =

Legendary Welsh ruler

Gwyddno Garanhir was the supposed ruler of a sunken land off the coast of Wales, known as Cantre'r Gwaelod. He was the father of Elffin ap Gwyddno, the foster-father of the famous Welsh poet Taliesin in the legendary account given in the late medieval Chwedl Taliesin (Ystoria Taliesin/Hanes Taliesin; "The Tale of Taliesin").

== Legend ==
The basket of Gwyddno Garanhir is one of the Thirteen Treasures of the Island of Britain. According to tradition, Gwyddno was the lord of Cantre'r Gwaelod (English: The Lowland Hundred) in what is now Cardigan Bay. His chief fortress was said to have been Caer Wyddno (English: the Fort of Gwyddno), located somewhere to the north-west of modern-day Aberystwyth. The whole kingdom was protected from the sea by floodgates, which had to be shut before high tide. One day the keeper of the floodgates, Seithenyn, was drunk and failed to close them, with the result that the sea rushed in and covered the land.

== Kingdom ==
Stories of the drowned lands of Gwyddno appear to have arisen from the identification of natural underwater ridges as the remains of sea walls. However, tradition also assigns Gwyddno a landlocked portion of his kingdom to which he was able to flee. He was called 'King of Ceredigion' by the 18th century Welsh antiquarian, Iolo Morganwg, well known for his literary forgeries, but he does not appear in the Old Welsh pedigrees for that kingdom. He is identified with a number of different historical Gwyddnos in various sources. 16th century writers favoured Gwyddno ap Clydno, the late 6th century King of Meirionydd, who is perhaps the most likely candidate.

In Susan Cooper's The Dark Is Rising series, Gwyddno is the king of the Lost Lands in Silver on the Tree.

== Epithet ==
His name is Welsh and means Gwyddno Long-Shanks, Crane-Legs, or literally Tall-Crane.
