= Bardic Grammar =

Medieval Welsh grammar for bards

Bardic Grammar is a medieval Welsh grammar that provided bards (qualified poets) with rules of writing poetry. Bards’ works celebrated heroic deeds of their patrons.

== Grammar rules ==
The knowledge of poetics was thought to be an inherent part of bardic craft. Bards learnt in special bardic schools, where the main emphasis was put on mastering rules referring to strict metres. The reason for that is that the poetry written with the use of strict metres was perceived as “the major glory of Welsh literature”. A trained aspirant could become one of the 3 types of bards:

- prydydd (poet);
- teuluwr (man of household);
- clerwr (strolling minstrel or itinerant poet).

As Sir Thomas Wiliems stated,it was Einion Offeiriad who developed the medieval Welsh bardic grammar, which can be separated into two parts:

- Part concerning the science of grammar;
- Part concerning properties of Welsh prosody and a craft of a bard.

According to some manuscripts, two parts of speech can be distinguished in Welsh bardic grammar: noun and verb, whereas syllables were divided into trwn (heavy - two consonants at the end) and ysgafn (light - a single consonant at the end). The process of trwm ac ysgafn (referring to rhyming a heavy syllable with a light syllable) was perceived as one of the mistakes in writing. The division of diphthongs was:

1. Dipton dalgron (‘compact or neat diphthong’) - aw, ew, iw, yw, uw;
2. Dipton wib (‘straying diphthong’) - eu;
3. Dipton leddf (‘inclining diphthong’) - ae, oe, ei, ŵy.

== Classification of candidates for bard ==
- Disgybl ysbas heb radd (an entitled student without degree)
- Disgybl ysbas graddol (an entitled student with degree)
- Disgybl disgybblaidd (a disciplined student)
- Disgybl pencerddaidd (a student having chief-of-song degree)
- Pencerdd (a chief-of-song)
