= Cynocephaly =

Mythical creature

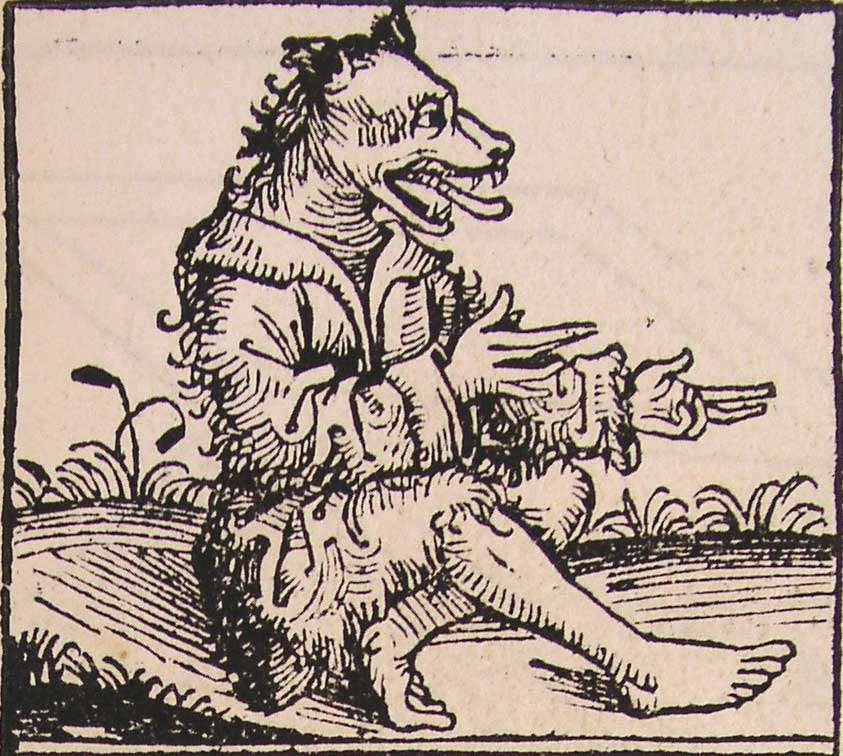
A cynocephalus. From the Nuremberg Chronicle (1493).

The characteristic of cynocephaly, or cynocephalus (/saɪnoʊˈsɛfəli/), having the head of a canid, typically that of a dog or jackal, is a widely attested mythical phenomenon existing in many different forms and contexts. The literal meaning of cynocephaly is "dog-headedness", though it is implied that this refers to a human body with a canine head. Such cynocephalics are known in mythology and legend from many parts of the world, including ancient Egypt, Libya, Greece, India and China. Further mentions come from the medieval East and Europe. In modern popular culture cynocephalics are also encountered as characters in books, comics, and graphic novels. Cynocephaly is generally distinguished from lycanthropy (werewolfism) and dogs that can talk.

== Etymology ==
The word cynocephaly is taken (through Latin) from the Greek word κυνοκέφαλοι kynokephaloi, plural of the word κυνοκέφαλος, from kyno– (combining form of κύων kyōn) meaning "dog" and κεφαλή kephalē meaning "head".

The same "dog" root is found in the name Cynomorpha ("dog-shaped") for a sub-group of the family of Old World monkeys, which contains many species of macaques and baboons.

== Ancient Greece and Egypt ==
Cynocephaly was familiar to the ancient Greeks from representations of the Egyptian gods Duamutef (son of Horus), Wepwawet (the opener of the ways), and Anubis (the god of the dead) with the heads of jackals. The Greek word (Greek: κῠνοκέφᾰλοι) "dog-head" also identified a sacred Egyptian baboon with a dog-like face. Rather than literally depicting a hybrid human-animal state, these cynocephalic portrayals of deities conveyed those deities' therianthropic ability to shift between fully human and fully animal states. In an Ancient Egyptian hybrid image, the head represents the original form of the being depicted, so that, as the Egyptologist Henry Fischer put it, "a lion-headed goddess is a lion-goddess in human form, while a royal sphinx, conversely, is a man who has assumed the form of a lion." This non-literal approach to depicting deities may have confused visitors from Greece, leading them to believe that Egyptians worshipped cynocephalic gods, or even that mortal cynocephalic entities populated Egypt.

The Greeks and Romans called a species of ape cynocephalus. This species is suspected to be a baboon.

Reports of dog-headed races can also be traced back to Greek antiquity. In the fifth century BC, the Greek physician Ctesias, in his Indica, wrote a detailed report on the existence of cynocephali in India. Similarly, the Greek traveler Megasthenes claimed to know about dog-headed people in India who lived in the mountains, communicated through barking, wore the skins of wild animals and lived by hunting. Claudius Aelianus also mentioned the dog-headed tribes in India, and he, too, wrote that they are of human shape and clothed in the skins of beasts. He also added that although they have no speech and howled to communicate, they were capable of understanding the Indian language. Herodotus reports claims by ancient Libyans that such creatures inhabit the east of their lands, as well as headless men and various other anomalies.

The best estimate for the place where the battle between the Argonauts and the Cynocephali took place is modern day North Serbia or South Hungary.

Some Greek writers also mention the Hemicynes (singular, Hemicyon), meaning half-dogs (from "ἡμι" meaning "half" and "κύων" meaning "dog").

== Late Antiquity ==
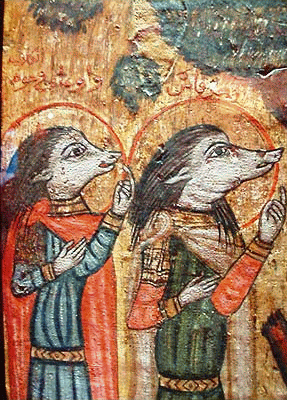
Saints Ahrakas and Augani (icon XVIII c.)

There is a description of two saints, Ahrakas and Augani, each with a dog's head, from the legend about the life of the Saint Mercurius, whom they faithfully served. According to the Coptic legend, preserved in an Arabic translation, the two "cynophali devoured the grandfather of St. Mercurius, and were preparing to eat his father when an angel appeared and surrounded them with a ring of fire. They repented and became companions of the father, and later accompanied Mercurius into battle." They are described as being "bodyguards" of Mercurius. Their image on the icon is in the Coptic Museum. Based on the style of clothing, the icon is "most likely copied from a 4th- or 5th- century image."

The cynocephali offered such an evocative image of the magic and brutality deemed characteristic of bizarre people from distant places that they continued to recur in medieval literature. Augustine of Hippo mentioned the cynocephali in The City of God, Book XVI, Chapter 8, in the context of discussing whether such beings were descendants of Adam; he considered the possibility that they might not exist at all, or might not be human (which Augustine defines as being a mortal and rational animal: homo, id est animal rationale mortale), but insisted that if they were human they were indeed descendants of Adam.

== Saint Christopher ==
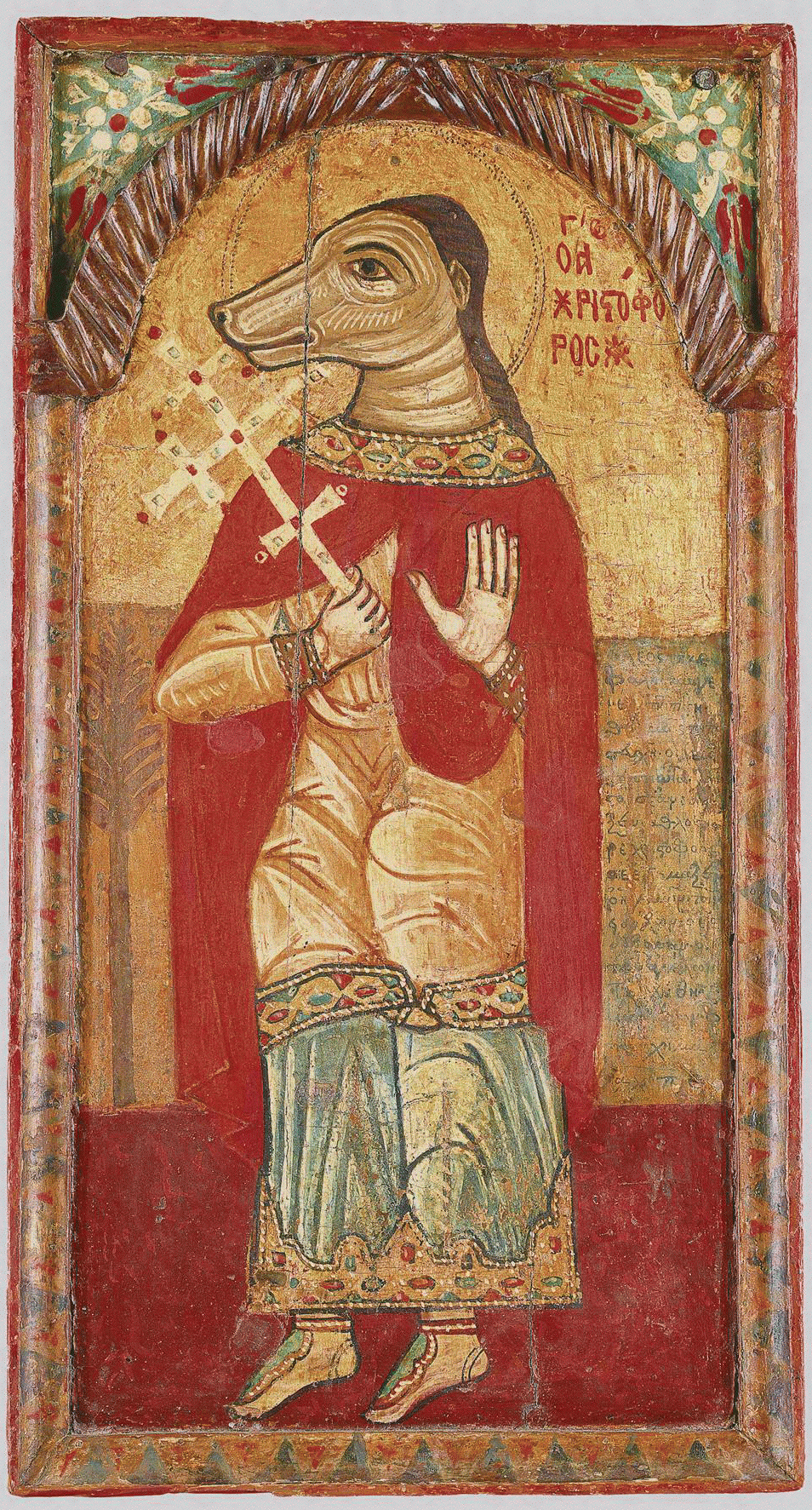
Cynocephalus Saint Christopher

In the Eastern Orthodox Church, certain icons covertly identify Saint Christopher with the head of a dog. Christopher pictured with a dog's head is not generally supported by the Orthodox Church, as the icon was proscribed in the 18th century by Moscow.

The roots of that iconography lie in a hagiographic narrative set during the reign of the Emperor Diocletian, which tell of a man named Reprebus, Rebrebus or Reprobus (the "reprobate" or "scoundrel") being captured by Roman forces fighting against tribes dwelling to the west of Egypt in Cyrenaica and forced to join the Roman numerus Marmaritarum or "Unit of the Marmaritae", which suggests an otherwise-unidentified "Marmaritae" (perhaps the same as the Marmaricae Berber tribe of Cyrenaica). He was reported to be of enormous size, with the head of a dog instead of a man, both apparently being typical of the Marmaritae. He and the unit were later transferred to Syrian Antioch, where bishop Peter of Attalia baptised him and where he was martyred in 308. It has also been speculated that this Byzantine depiction of St. Christopher as dog-headed may have resulted from a misreading of the Latin term Cananeus (Canaanite) as caninus, that is, "canine".

The late 10th century German bishop and poet Walter of Speyer portrayed St. Christopher as a giant of a cynocephalic species in the land of the Chananeans (Canaan in the New Testament) who ate human flesh and barked. Eventually, Christopher met the Christ child, regretted his former behavior, and received baptism. He, too, was rewarded with a human appearance, whereupon he devoted his life to Christian service and became an Athleta Christi, one of the military saints.

== Medieval East ==
Depiction of cynocephali in al-Qazwini's Aja'ib al-Makhluqat

Cynocephali also figure in medieval Christian worldviews. A legend that placed Andrew the Apostle and Bartholomew the Apostle among the Parthians presented the case of "Abominable", the citizen of the "city of cannibals... whose face was like unto that of a dog." After receiving baptism, however, he was released from his doggish aspect.

An illustrated description of cynocephali appears in the 1280 paradoxography Aja'ib al-Makhluqat by Zakariya al-Qazwini. It bears a striking resemblance to the late antique accounts, which caused Rudolf Wittkower to speculate that illustrated encyclopedias by Solinus and perhaps Isidore of Seville were circulating as far as al-Qazwini's Iraq.

=== Ibn Battuta ===
In the fourteenth century, Ibn Battuta encountered what were described as "dog-mouthed" people on his journey, possibly describing a group of Mentawai people (who practice tooth sharpening), living on an island between India and Sumatra:

Fifteen days after leaving Sunaridwan we reached the country of the Barahnakar, whose mouths are like those of dogs. This tribe is a rabble, professing neither the religion of the Hindus nor any other. They live in reed huts roofed with grasses on the seashore, and have abundant banana, areca, and betel trees. Their men are shaped like ourselves, except that their mouths are shaped like those of dogs; this is not the case with their womenfolk, however, who are endowed with surpassing beauty. Their men too go unclothed, not even hiding their nakedness, except occasionally for an ornamental pouch of reeds suspended from their waist. The women wear aprons of leaves of trees. With them reside a number of Muslims from Bengal and Sumatra, who occupy a separate quarter. The natives do all their trafficking with the merchants on the shore, and bring them water on elephants, because the water is at some distance from the coast and they will not let the merchants go to draw it for themselves, fearing for their women because they make advances to well-formed men. Elephants are numerous in their land, but no one may dispose of them except the sultan, from whom they are bought in exchange for woven stuffs.

— Ibn Battuta

== Medieval West ==
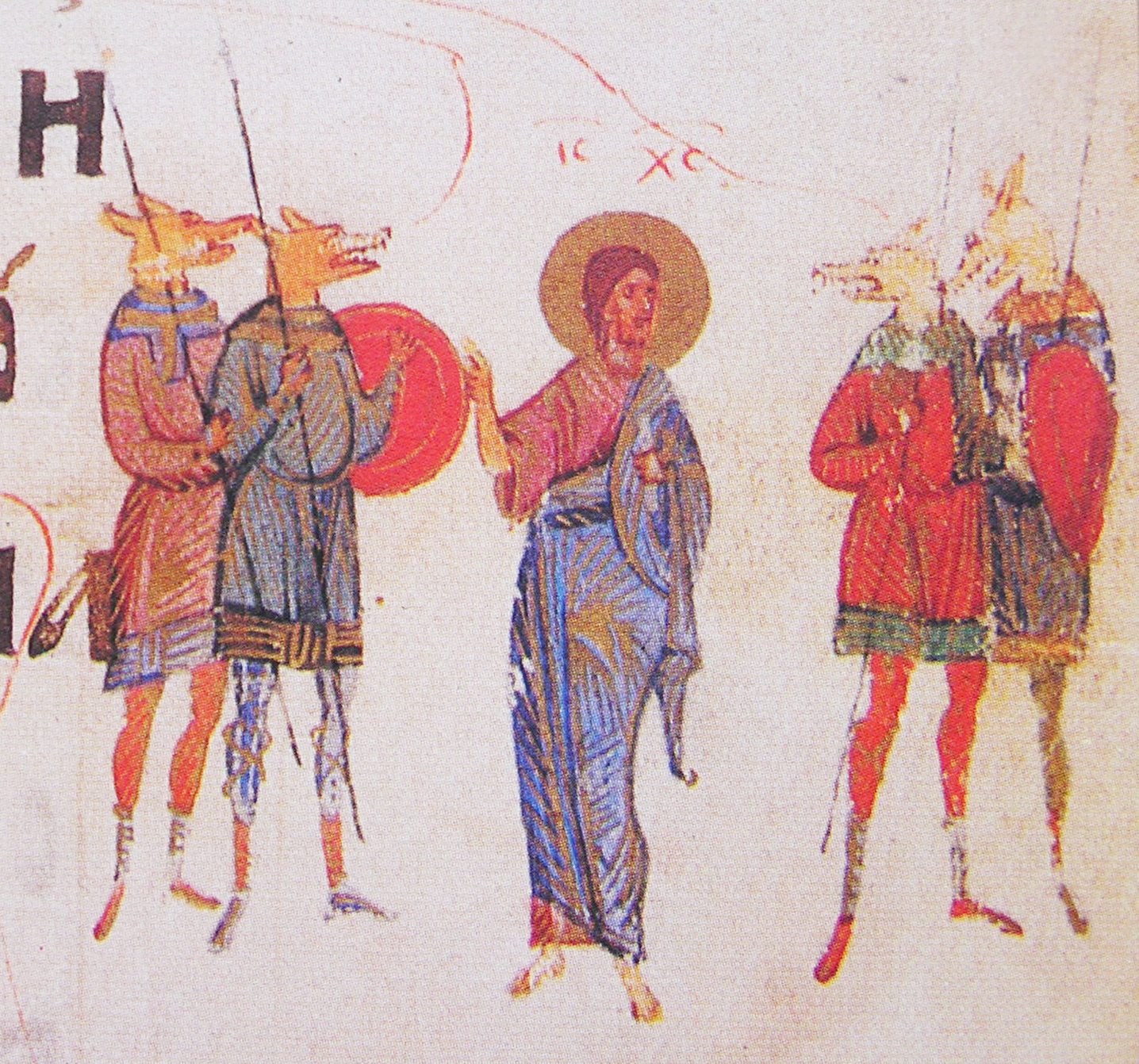
Cynocephali illustrated in the Kiev Psalter of 1397

Paul the Deacon mentions cynocephali in his Historia gentis Langobardorum: "They pretend that they have in their camps Cynocephali, that is, men with dogs' heads. They spread the rumor among the enemy that these men wage war obstinately, drink human blood and quaff their own gore if they cannot reach the foe." (Note: simulant se in castris suis habere cynocephalos, id est canini capitis homines. Divulgant apud hostes, hos pertinaciter bella gerere, humanum sanguinem bibere et, si hostem adsequi non-possint, proprium potare cruorum.) At the court of Charlemagne, the Norse were given this attribution, implying un-Christian and less-than-human qualities: "I am greatly saddened" said the King of the Franks, in Notker's Life, "that I have not been thought worthy to let my Christian hand sport with these dog-heads." The ninth-century Frankish theologian Ratramnus wrote a letter, the Epistola de Cynocephalis, on whether the Cynocephali should be considered human (he thought that they were). If human, a Christian's duty would be to preach the Gospels to them. If animals, and thus without souls, doing so would be pointless. Quoting St. Jerome, Thomas of Cantimpré corroborated the existence of Cynocephali in his Liber de Monstruosis Hominibus Orientis, xiv, ("Book of Monstrous men of the Orient"). The thirteenth-century encyclopedist Vincent of Beauvais acquainted his patron Saint Louis IX of France with "an animal with the head of the dog but with all other members of human appearance… Though he behaves like a man… and, when peaceful, he is tender like a man, when furious, he becomes cruel and retaliates on humankind".

The Nowell Codex, perhaps more commonly known as the manuscript containing the Anglo-Saxon epic Beowulf, also contains references to Cynocephali. One such reference can be found in the part of the manuscript known as The Wonders of the East, in which they are called "healfhundingas" or "half-dogs." Also, in Anglo-Saxon England, the Old English word wulfes heafod ("wolf's head") was a technical term for an outlaw, who could be killed as if he were a wolf. The so-called Leges Edwardi Confessoris, written around 1140, however, offered a somewhat literal interpretation: “[6.2a] For from the day of his outlawry he bears a wolf's head, which is called wluesheued by the English. [6.2b] And this sentence is the same for all outlaws." (Note: lupinum enim caput geret a die utlagacionis sue, quod ab Anglis 'uuluesheued' [Old English wulfes heafod 'wolf's head] nominatur. Et haec sententia communis est de omnibus utlagis.) Cynocephali appear in the Old Welsh poem Pa gur? as cinbin (dogheads). Here they are enemies of King Arthur's retinue; Arthur's men fight them in the mountains of Eidyn (Edinburgh), and hundreds of them fall at the hand of Arthur's warrior Bedwyr (later known as Bedivere). The next lines of the poem also mention a fight with a character named Garwlwyd (Rough-Gray); a Gwrgi Garwlwyd (Man-Dog Rough-Gray) appears in one of the Welsh Triads, where he is described in such a way that scholars have discussed him as a werewolf.

=== High and late medieval travel literature ===
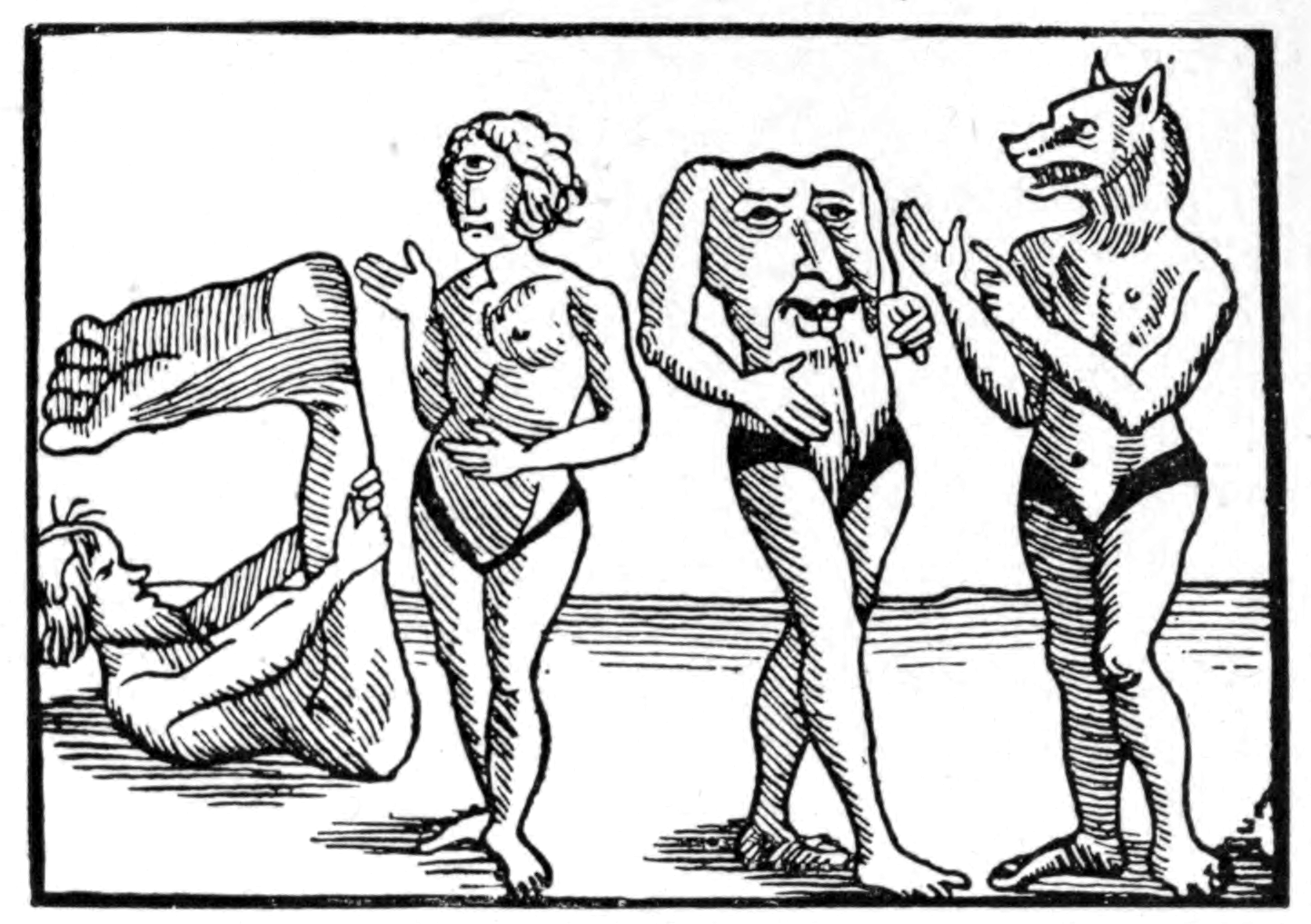
A cynocephalus alongside a Blemmy, a cyclops and a sciapod, from The Voyage and Travels of Sir John Mandeville

Medieval travellers Giovanni da Pian del Carpine and Marco Polo both mention cynocephali. Giovanni writes of the armies of Ögedei Khan who encounter a race of dogheads who live north of the Dalai-Nor (Northern Ocean), or Lake Baikal. The Travels of Marco Polo mentions dog-headed barbarians on the island of Angamanain, or the Andaman Islands. For Polo, although these people grow spices, they are nonetheless cruel and "are all just like big mastiff dogs". In The Voyage and Travels of Sir John Mandeville, dog-headed men are described as inhabiting the island of Nacumera (the Nicobar Islands).

The dog-headed people were also found in the New World. Christopher Columbus reported that the Taino were familiar with the cynocephali. In 1517, the Ottoman Sultan Selim I was presented with a map of the New World drawn by Piri Reis, which included an image of a dog-headed man fighting a monkey in what is now Colombia. In 1519, the Governor of Cuba instructed Hernán Cortés to investigate rumours of cynocephali while on his expedition to the American mainland.

According to Henri Cordier, the source of all the fables of the dog-headed barbarians, whether European, Arabic, or Chinese, can be found in the Alexander Romance.

== Modern European ==
In his feature Giant Egg, David Attenborough speculates that the indri, a type of lemur from Madagascar, may be one possible origin to the myth of dog-headed men.

== China ==
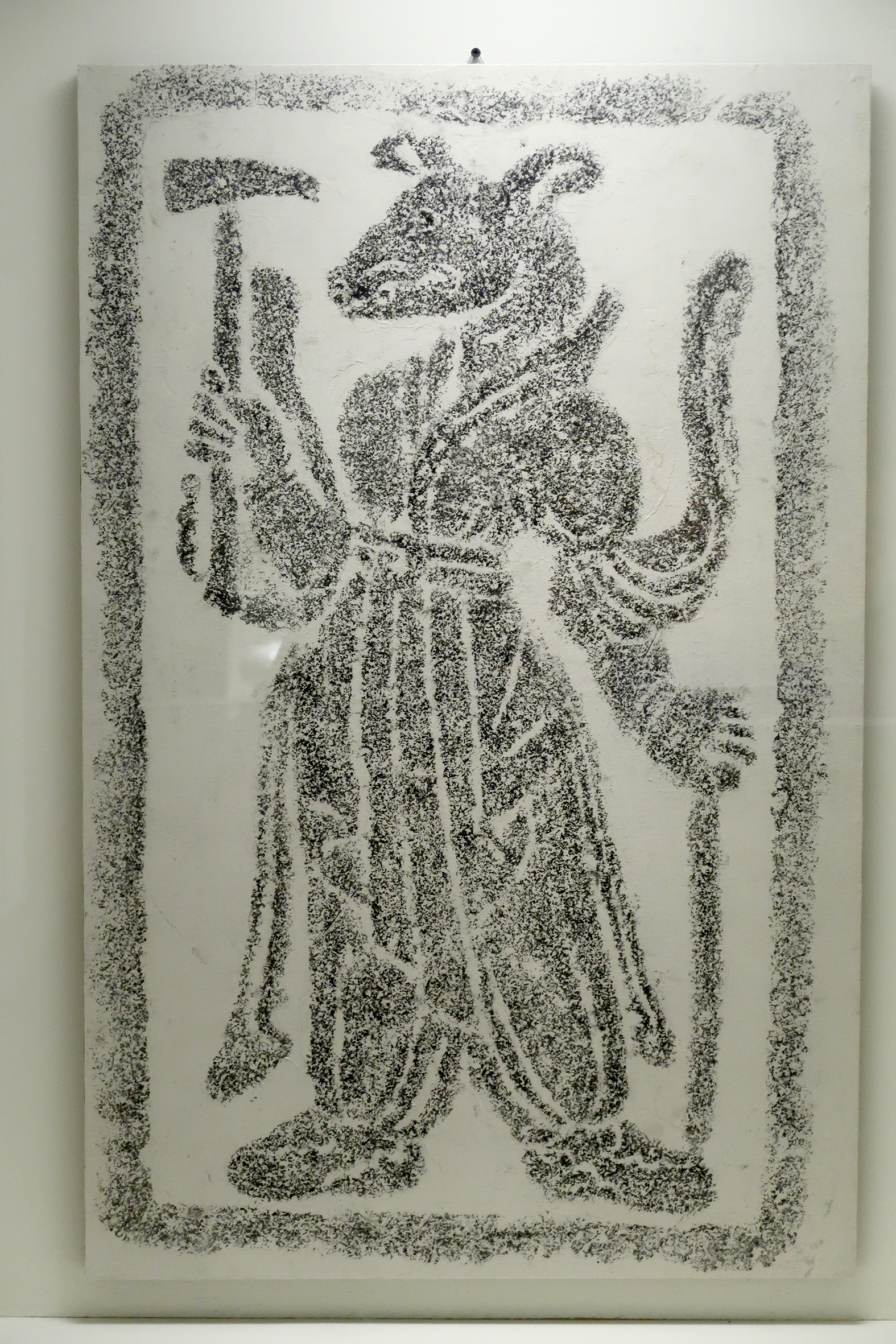
Figure of the Eastern Zodiacal Dog as a dog headed and possibly tailed person. Rubbing from the tomb of Kim Yu-sin of Later Silla (now Korea).

In Central and East Asia a common calendar system consists of a twelve-year cycle, with each year represented as an animal. The eleventh animal of the twelve-year cycle is the dog. Often such animals are depicted as human figures with an animal head. Thus, the cynocephalic depiction of the eleventh zodiac animal is common (possibly with a tail).

Additionally, in the Chinese record Book of Liang, the Buddhist missionary Hui Shen describes an island of dog-headed men to the east of Fusang, a nation he visited variously identified as Japan or the Americas. The History of the Northern Dynasties of Li Dashi and his son, Li Yanshou, Tang historians, also mentions the "dog kingdom".

== Other dog-headed creatures in legend ==
- The Talmud states that at the time before the Messiah, the "face of the generation will have the face of a dog." Talmud, Sotah 49b; Talmud, Sanhedrin 97a
- According to the Greek Apocalypse of Baruch, human-like beings with the appearance of dogs and the feet of deer are seen by Baruch in the Second Heaven.
- The Chinese legend of Fuxi included variations where he had a dog's head, or he and his sister Nüwa had ugly faces.
- In Saami mythology, according to Craig Chalquist, Padnakjunne ("Dog-Face") are cannibalistic humanoids with dog snouts.
- In the United States there are tales of dog-headed creatures, including the Michigan Dogman, and the wolf-like Beast of Bray Road of Wisconsin.
- In Estonia, Koerakoonlane (literally 'dogsnouters') were part of mythology, as gathered by Friedrich Reinhold Kreutzwald.
- The Wulver of Shetland in Scotland.
- Psoglav in Serbian mythology.
- Itbarak in Turkic mythology
- Adlet in Inuit mythology, specifically that of Greenland, Labrador, and Hudson Bay

== See also ==
- Barber-Say syndrome – Rare congenital disorder
- Ghouls and qutrubs sharing same origin of myth
- Saint Guinefort – Legendary dog venerated as a folk saint
- Theriocephaly, generic term for human-shaped bodies with animal heads
- Ulfheðnar, wolf-associated berserkers
- Werewolf – Mythological human able to transform into a wolf
