= Afaon fab Taliesin =

According to Welsh tradition, Afaon fab Taliesin (also spelled as Addaon) was the son of the bard Taliesin and a member of King Arthur's retinue. He appears both in the Welsh Triads and in the medieval Arthurian tale Breuddwyd Rhonabwy.

== Role in Welsh tradition ==
According to the Dream of Rhonabwy, Afaon fought alongside Arthur at the Battle of Badon as one of his chief counsellors. He recklessly rode past Arthur prior to the battle, splashing the king in his haste, and was rebuked by Elffin ap Gwyddno. Despite his recklessness, he was referred to by Iddog ap Mynio as "the wisest and most accomplished in the kingdom".

He is alluded to several times in the Welsh Triads. Triad 7 calls him one of the "Three Bull-Chieftains of the Island of Britain", together with two other sons of bards. Triad 25 names him one of the "Three Battle-Rulers of the Island of Britain". Triad 33 describes his death at the hands of Llawgat Trwm Bargod Eidyn (Heavy Battle-Hand of the Border of Eidyn) as one of the "Three Unfortunate Slaughters of the Island of Britain". An alternate version of this triad, 33 W., titled "Three Savage Men of the Island of Britain, who performed the Three Unfortunate (Ill-omened) Slaughters", renders the killer's name slightly differently as Llongad Grwm Fargod Eidyn (Llongad the Bent of the Border of Eidyn).

Afaon is further mentioned in the late twelfth century Enlyngion y Clyweit, a collection of proverbial englyns attributed to various historical and mythological heroes. The text claims that he once sang the proverb "The cheek will not conceal the anguish of the heart".

== Sources ==
- Bromwich, Rachel (2006). Trioedd Ynys Prydein: The Triads of the Island of Britain. University of Wales Press. ISBN 0-19-211696-7.
