= Pa Ŵr yw'r Porthor? =

Early Welsh poem

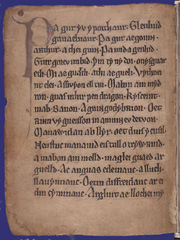
The opening lines of Pa Ŵr in the original manuscript, the Black Book of Carmarthen

Poem 31 of the Black Book of Carmarthen, a mid-13th-century manuscript, is known from its first line as Pa Ŵr yw'r Porthor? (Middle Welsh: Pa gur yv y porthaur? 'What man is the gatekeeper?') and alternatively as Pa Ŵr, Pa gur, or Ymddiddan Arthur a Glewlwyd Gafaelfawr ("The dialogue of Arthur and Glewlwyd Gafaelfawr"). It is a fragmentary, anonymous poem in Old Welsh, taking the form of a dialogue between King Arthur and the gatekeeper Glewlwyd Gafaelfawr, in which Arthur boasts of his own exploits and those of his companions, especially Cai the Fair. Pa Ŵr is notable for being one of the earliest vernacular Arthurian works, and for alluding to several early adventures of Arthur which are now lost. Its precise age is not known and has been the subject of wide-ranging disagreement, but scholarly opinion now tends to favour a date of c. 1100.

== Summary ==
Pa Ŵr is in places a very difficult text, and translations of it vary widely. This summary is based on the version of Jon B. Coe and Simon Young (see below).

The poem begins with Arthur asking the porter's name. Glewlwyd Gafaelfawr duly identifies himself and returns the question, upon which Arthur names himself and says his party consists of Cai the Fair and "the best men in the world". Glewlwyd demands Arthur vouch for them, so Arthur names his men and praises their exploits: Mabon son of Modron, Uthr Pendragon's servant; Cyscaint son of Banon; Gwyn Goddyfrion; Manawydan son of Llŷr, who bore "pierced shields from Tryfrwyd"; Mabon son of Mellt; Anwas the Winged and Llwch the Windy-Handed, who have been defending Edinburgh; and finally Cai, who "would implore them, while he slew them, three at a time."

The subject now turns to Arthur himself, who is said to have fought against a witch in the hall of Afarnach, against a certain Pen Palach in the dwellings of Disethach, and against dog-heads at the mount of Edinburgh. Bedwyr Perfect-Sinew slew his enemies by the hundred, and he fought ferociously on the shores of Tryfrwyd. [It has been suggested that this passage about Arthur and Bedwyr is spoken not by Arthur but by Cai.]

Arthur again praises at length Cai's prowess in battle, only to interrupt himself with the reflection that

I had servants,
it was better when they were alive.

"Before the lords of Emrys", Arthur says, "I saw Cai at haste." Not only is his vengeance heavy and his anger bitter, but

When he drank from a horn
he would drink like four.

So mighty a warrior is Cai that his death can only be contrived by God himself. Cai and Llachau, we are told, "fulfilled battles". Cai attacked nine witches at the peak of Ystafngwn, and lions in Anglesey. Then follows the beginning of a description of another of Cai's adversaries, the terrible cat of Palug, against whom "his shield was polished".

Nine-score soldiers
would fall as its food;
nine-score champions…

The rest of the poem is lost.

== Date and place of origin ==
The dating of Old Welsh texts presents great problems, even the linguistic criteria for dating them not having yet been agreed on. Pa Ŵr is a case in point. In 1959 the great linguist Kenneth Hurlstone Jackson went no further than saying that it was probably older than the Norman period. In later years Rachel Bromwich, John Bollard and A. O. H. Jarman were agreed in assigning it to the 10th or 11th century, with Brynley Roberts tentatively narrowing that down to the 10th, though John T. Koch believed that the 9th century or even the 8th was possible. However, recent scholarly opinion has tended to favour a later date of around 1100.

The question of where Pa Ŵr was written has received less attention, but Patrick Sims-Williams has suggested south-east Wales. He argues from certain similarities to, firstly, the Vita Sancti Cadocis of Lifris of Llancarfan, a work with a Glamorgan subject and author, and secondly, an episode of the Welsh romance of Peredur set in Gloucester, near the south-east Welsh border. He also interprets the poem as including a reference to the river Ely, in Glamorgan.

== The character of Arthur ==
The Arthur of Pa Ŵr is a folk-tale figure, a wandering hero leading a band of other heroes in an irresponsible life of adventures that pit them against monsters and magical adversaries, rather like the fíanna of early Irish literature. His companions – including Cai and Bedwyr, both important figures in later Arthurian legend – each have their own qualities which they can bring to any encounter, but Arthur is a fighter in his own right, not just a commander. It has been suggested that Arthur himself has supernatural powers in the poem, specifically the ability to make himself and his men invisible, though this interpretation rests on a contested translation of a difficult line. The general tone of the poem can be seen as light-hearted. At the same time, Arthur's repeated use of the past tense in his boasts about his companions' exploits arguably give them an elegiac tone, suggesting the possibility that we should see the Arthur of the poem as a man past his glory years and living in the past with a sadly diminished following.

== Sources and analogues ==
Pa Ŵr has often been compared to the tale of Culhwch and Olwen. One general similarity lies in the use both works make of allusion to a string of stories featuring Arthur and his men, but there is also a more specific one. In Pa Ŵr the gatekeeper Glewlwyd Gafaelfawr questions Arthur's right to be admitted; in Culhwch and Olwen, where he is Arthur's gatekeeper, he similarly demands to know Culhwch's qualifications to be let in, and later in the tale the giant Wrnach Gawr's gatekeeper admits Cai after questioning him. There is no agreement as to the relationship between these three episodes, but it is possible that the author of Culhwch was burlesquing Pa Ŵr. Alternatively, both authors may simply be drawing on the same early Arthurian traditions. There are somewhat similar episodes elsewhere in medieval literature: in the Cambro-Latin Historia Brittonum, in the Irish tale of the Second Battle of Moytura, in the late-medieval English ballad "King Arthur and King Cornwall", and possibly even in the famous 12th-century Arthurian carvings in Modena Cathedral. But, as Patrick Sims-Williams notes, "such exchanges with recalcitrant porters were commonplace…in real life, too, no doubt".

Cath Palug, or the cat of Palug, with whom Cai fought, also appears in the Welsh Triads. Wildcats figure in later French Arthurian romances, under the name C(h)apalu in an oral tradition reported by the 14th-century Scottish chronicler John of Fordun, where they fight Caius; and in an anonymous 15th-century English story, which tells us that Arthur vanquished some wildcats by tricking them into attacking their own reflections in his glass shield. This last stratagem doubtless explains why Cai's shield was polished when fighting the cat of Palug in Pa Ŵr.

The fight at Tryfrwyd in Pa Ŵr seems to be identical with the bellum Tribruit, listed by the Historia Brittonum as one of Arthur's twelve battles. But whereas Historia Brittonum treats the battle as historical, in Pa Ŵr it is entirely mythical, being fought against the werewolf Garwlwyd and an army of dog-headed monsters.

The nine witches of the peak of Ystafngwn have reminded some commentators of the nine witches of Gloucester in Peredur, the similar nine witches in the first Life of St Samson (an early Breton-Latin work), and the nine maidens tending the cauldron in Preiddeu Annwn.

The names of some of the characters mentioned in Pa Ŵr, such as Manawydan son of Llyr and Mabon son of Modron, belong to the world of Welsh mythology that was also drawn on in the Four Branches of the Mabinogi.

Finally, the "lords of Emrys" referred to in the poem could be seen as relating to the character named in the Historia Brittonum and Gildas's De Excidio et Conquestu Britanniae as Ambrosius ("Emrys" in Welsh), but the Pa Ŵr poet need not necessarily have known either work: it has been pointed out that Emrys was used by Welsh poets as a synonym of Gwynedd.

== Modern editions ==
- Roberts, Brynley (1978). Bromwich, Rachel; Jones, R. Brinley (eds.). Astudiaethau ar yr Hengerdd. Caerdydd: Gwasg Prifysgol Cymru. pp. 296–301. ISBN 0708306969.
- Jarman, A. O. H., ed. (1982). Llyfr Du Caerfyrddin. Caerdydd: Cyhoeddwyd ar ran Bwrdd Gwybodau Celtaidd Prifysgol Cymru [gan] Wasg Prifysgol Cymru. pp. 66–68. ISBN 0708306292.
- Coe, Jon B.; Young, Simon (1995). The Celtic Sources for the Arthurian Legend. [Felinfach]: Llanerch. pp. 128, 130, 132. ISBN 1897853831.

== Modern translations ==
- Bromwich, Rachel, in Barber, Richard (1972). The Figure of Arthur. London: Longman. pp. 69–71. ISBN 0582125839.
- Bromwich, Rachel (1983). "Celtic Elements in Arthurian Romance: A General Survey". In Grout, P. B.; Lodge, R. A.; Pickford, C. E.; Varty, E. K. C. (eds.). The Legend of Arthur in the Middle Ages: Studies Presented to A. H. Diverres. Arthurian Studies, 7. Cambridge: D. S. Brewer. pp. 45–46. ISBN 0859911322.
- Bollard, John K. (1994) [1983]. "Arthur in the Early Welsh Tradition". In Wilhelm, James J. (ed.). The Romance of Arthur. New York: Garland. pp. 17-18. ISBN 0815315112.
- Sims-Williams, Patrick (1991). "The Early Welsh Arthurian Poems". In Bromwich, Rachel; Jarman, A. O. H.; Roberts, Brynley F. (eds.). The Arthur of the Welsh: The Arthurian Legend in Medieval Welsh Literature. Cardiff: University of Wales Press. pp. 40–45. ISBN 0708311075.
- Bromwich, Rachel; Evans, D. Simon, eds. (1992). Culhwch and Olwen: An Edition and Study of the Oldest Arthurian Tale. Cardiff: University of Wales Press. pp. xxxv–xxxvi. ISBN 070831127X.
- Koch, John T., ed. (1995) [1994]. The Celtic Heroic Age: Literary Sources for Ancient Celtic Europe and Early Ireland and Wales. Malden, Mass.: Celtic Studies. pp. 292–295. ISBN 0964244616.
- Coe, Jon B.; Young, Simon (1995). The Celtic Sources for the Arthurian Legend. [Felinfach]: Llanerch. pp. 129, 131, 133. ISBN 1897853831.
- Matthews, John (2008) [2004]. King Arthur: Dark Age Warrior and Mythic Hero. New York: Rosen. p. 31. ISBN 9781404213647.
- Davis, Craig (2014). "Arthur in Early Wales/Culhwch and Olwen". In Kibler, William W.; Palmer, R. Barton (eds.). Medieval Arthurian Epic and Romance: Eight New Translations. Jefferson, NC: McFarland. pp. 75–76. ISBN 9780786447794.
