= Mother Irini =

Coptic abbess

Saint Mother Irini

Personal details
- Born: Fawzia; 9 February 1936 Girga, Egypt
- Died: 31 October 2006 Cairo, Egypt
- Buried: Convent of St. Mercurius (Abu-Sefein); Cairo, Egypt
- Denomination: Coptic Orthodox

Mother Irini (Coptic: ⲧⲉⲛⲙⲁⲩ Ⲓⲣⲏⲛⲏ, lit. ''Tenmav (Coptic for "Our Mother") Irene''; Arabic: امنا ايريني, lit. ''Umina (Our Mother in Arabic) Irini''; 9 February 1936 Girga – 31 October 2006 Cairo) was the Coptic Abbess of the St. Philopateer Mercurius’ (Abu Sefein, "of the two swords") Convent in Old Cairo, Egypt and an influential figure in the Coptic Christian community of Egypt.

Tamav was consecrated as the head of the convent on 15 October 1962 (Babah 5th 1679 according to the Coptic calendar). According to some accounts, Tamav was visited by, and communicated with, St. Philopatyr Mercurius and St. Anthony the Great. Tamav is credited with numerous miracles, while alive and after her death. At least six of her books have been translated in English.

== Upbringing ==
Tamav was born on 9 February 1936 in Girga, a small town in Upper Egypt in Sohag Governorate. She was the eldest of seven children born to wealthy Coptic Orthodox Christian parents. Tamav was baptised as a Christian in the Monastery of Saint Shenoudah the Archimandrite in Sohag.

== Abu Seifein monastery ==
On 6 October 1954, Tamav became a nun in the Convent of Abu Seifein in Cairo at age 18, the youngest nun there.

As with other nuns in her order, Tamav took a vow of lifetime poverty. On 15 October 1962, she was ordained the abbess of Abu-Sefain. Her life was to be focused instead on vigil, prayer, fasting and struggle, purity, poverty, solitude and stillness.

== Work as abbess ==
After becoming the abbess of the Convent of Abu Seifein, Tamav stated that she had received a vision of Christ and of St Pachomius the Great (292-348 AD), one of founders of the communal life of monks and nuns (Cenobitic Monasticism). St Pachom allegedly told Tamav to follow the rules of the Pachomian Koinonia (fellowship) in the convent. She then banned all forms of personal property or segregation, and introduced group prayers and meals.

Before Tamav became abbess, the nuns attended liturgy and communion in an adjacent church, dedicated to Saint Mercurius. Tamav founded St. Mercurius' Church and subsequently founded a second church inside the monastery in honor of the Virgin Mary, on the site where she sat with Jesus during the Holy Family's flight.

Mother Irene popularised the veneration of Mercurius among Coptic Christians. In this sense she is often compared with Pope Kyrillos VI whose name became associated with the Egyptian martyr, Mena. On Abi Seifein's feasts—celebrating his martyrdom, the coming of his relics to Egypt, and the consecration of the first Coptic church in his name—she would speak to the thousands who gathered about the miracles performed through the intercession of the saint.

In her weekly meetings, Tamav spoke about heaven to her audience, with the intention of conveying to them hope and consolation. Her talks attracted many devotees, and the number of nuns under her guidance increased. Some of her nuns became leaders of other convents in Cairo.

Under Tamav's guidance, Abu-Sefain published a book highlighting the contribution of women to monastic and ascetic life. The Angelic Life: The Virgin Mary and Other Virgins in Different Ages (Cairo: Harmony Printing House, 2002), can be regarded as a new historicist reading of the monastic movement, from which perspective it sets the record straight regarding the role played by women in this movement.

== Illness ==
After 25 years of ill health, On 31 October 2006 Tamav died. Thousands of mourners queued to pay their last respects to Tamav on the day following her death. At her funeral, Bishop Raphaeil (General Bishop) spoke on behalf of Pope Shenouda III.

In their memorial the nuns at Abu-Sefain described Tamav as their "enlightened mother, mentor, teacher, guide and the lamp whose light would remain for ever". They also expressed their gratitude "for being the daughters of the mother of monasticism in this generation, for having been watered by the fountain of her sacred life and enlightened by the torch of her monastic and spiritual teachings which will remain to guide us until we meet her in heaven". She was a good nun Amen. Amen.
