= Etymology of Edinburgh =

Origin of the place-name Edinburgh

The name Edinburgh is used in both English and Scots for the capital of Scotland; in Scottish Gaelic, the city is known as Dùn Èideann. Both names are derived from an older name for the surrounding region, Eidyn. It is generally accepted that this name in turn derives ultimately from the Celtic Common Brittonic language. Eithin is Welsh for "gorse".

== Eidyn ==
Several medieval Welsh sources refer to Eidyn. Kenneth H. Jackson argued strongly that "Eidyn" referred exclusively to the location of modern Edinburgh, but others, such as Ifor Williams and Nora K. Chadwick, suggest it applied to the wider area as well. The name "Eidyn" may survive today in toponyms such as Edinburgh, Dunedin, and Carriden (from Caer Eidyn, from which the modern Welsh name for Edinburgh, Caeredin, is derived), located eighteen miles to the west.

Present-day Edinburgh was the location of Din Eidyn, a dun or hillfort associated with the kingdom of the Gododdin. The term Din Eidyn first appears in Y Gododdin, a poem that depicts events relating to the Battle of Catraeth, thought to have been fought circa 600. The oldest manuscript of Y Gododdin forms part of the Book of Aneirin, which dates to around 1265 but which possibly is a copy of a lost 9th-century original. Some scholars consider that the poem was composed soon after the battle and was preserved in oral tradition while others believe it originated in Wales at some time in the 9th to 11th centuries. The modern Scottish Gaelic name "Dùn Èideann" derives directly from the British Din Eidyn. The English form is similar, appending the element -burgh, from the Old English burh, also meaning "fort".

Some sources claim Edinburgh's name is derived from an Old English form such as Edwinesburh (Edwin's fort), in reference to Edwin, king of Deira and Bernicia in the 7th century. However, modern scholarship rejects this idea, since the form Eidyn predates Edwin. Stuart Harris in his book The Place Names of Edinburgh declares the "Edwinesburh" form to be a "palpable fake" dating from King David I's time.

Edinburgh's original royal charter granting royal burgh status is lost and the first documentary evidence of the medieval burgh is a royal charter, c. 1124–1127, by King David I granting a toft in burgo meo de Edenesburg to the Priory of Dunfermline. This suggests that the town came into official existence between 1018 (when King Malcolm II secured the Lothians from the Northumbrians) and 1124. The founding charter of Holyrood Abbey refers to the recipients (in Latin) as "Ecclisie Sancte Crucis Edwinesburgensi", by the 1170s King William the Lion was using the name "Edenesburch" in a charter (again in Latin) confirming the 1124 grant of David I. Documents from the 14th century show the name to have settled into its current form; although other spellings ("Edynburgh" and "Edynburghe") appear, these are spelling variants of the current name.

== Other names ==
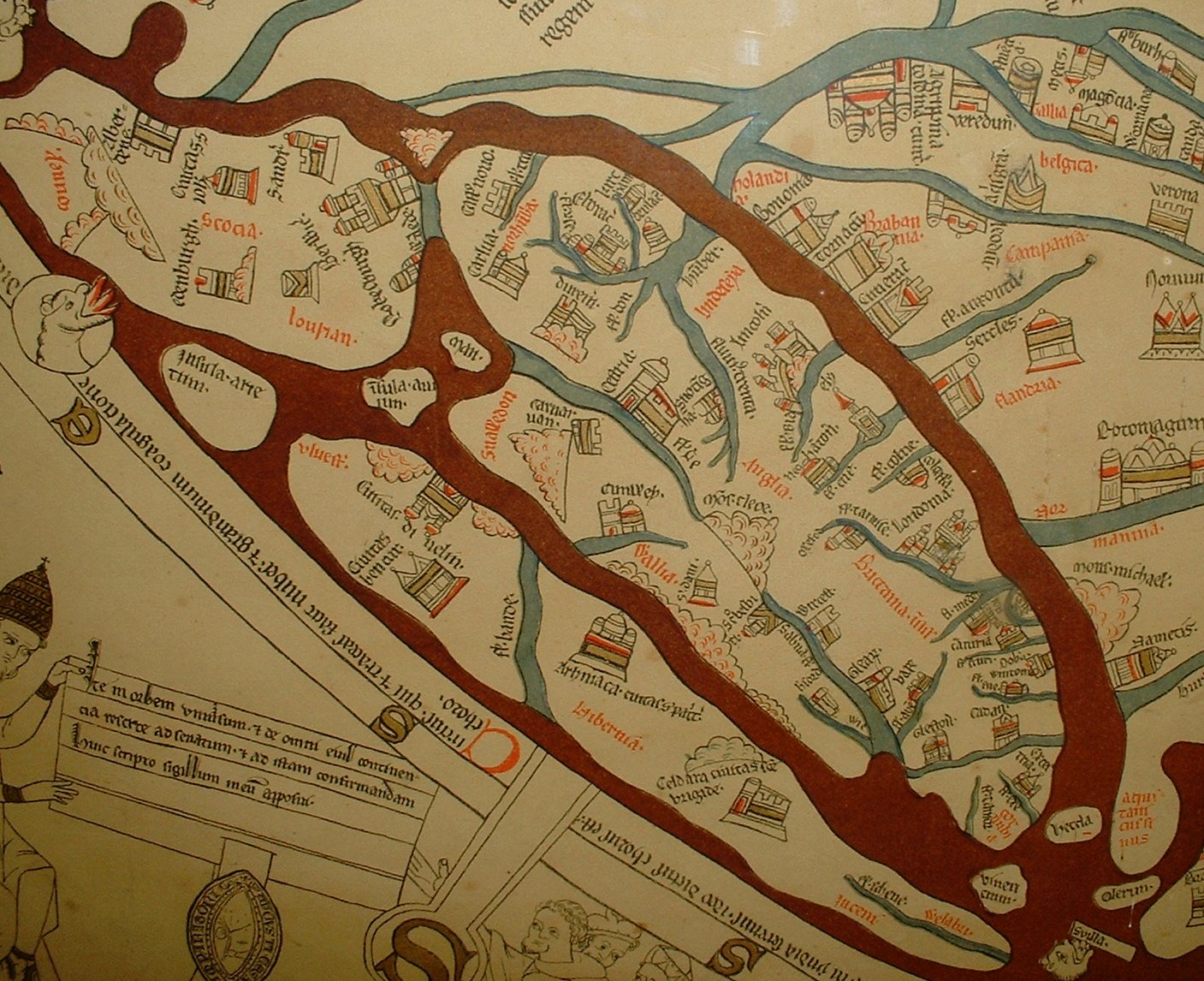
Detail of the Hereford Mappa Mundi, Edinburgh is labelled on this T and O map of the British isles from c. 1300

=== Auld Reekie ===
The city is affectionately nicknamed Auld Reekie, Scots for Old Smoky, for the views from the country of the smoke covered Old Town. Robert Chambers, who asserted that the sobriquet could not be traced before the reign of Charles II, attributed the name to a Fife laird, Durham of Largo, who regulated the bedtime of his children by the smoke rising above Edinburgh from the fires of the tenements.

=== Athens of the North/Modern Athens ===
Edinburgh has been called the Athens of the North or Modern Athens since at least the 18th century. The similarities were seen to be both topographical and intellectual. Edinburgh's Castle Rock reminded returning grand tourists of the Athenian Acropolis, as did aspects of the neoclassical architecture and layout of New Town. Both cities had flatter, fertile agricultural land sloping down to a port several miles away (respectively Leith and Piraeus). Intellectually, the Scottish Enlightenment with its humanist and rationalist outlook was influenced by Ancient Greek philosophy. The idea of a direct parallel between both cities gained wider recognition in 1822, when artist Hugh William Williams organized an exhibition that showed his paintings of Athens alongside views of Edinburgh. When plans were drawn up in the early 19th century to architecturally develop Calton Hill, the design of the National Monument by William Henry Playfair and Charles Robert Cockerell directly copied Athens' Parthenon. The moniker was not without its detractors: Lord Cockburn related in 1856 how the 'Modern Athens' was perceived to be "a sarcasm, or a piece of flattery, when used in a moral sense."

Tom Stoppard's character Archie, of Jumpers, said, perhaps playing on Reykjavík meaning "smoky bay", that the "Reykjavík of the South" would be more appropriate.

=== Dunedin ===
Edinburgh has also been known as Dunedin, deriving from the Scottish Gaelic, Dùn Èideann. Dunedin, New Zealand, was originally called "New Edinburgh" and is still nicknamed the "Edinburgh of the South".

=== Edina ===
Scots poets Robert Burns and Robert Fergusson sometimes used a poetic form of the city's name, Edina, for example, Robert Burns' Address to Edinburgh, "Edina! Scotia's darling seat!/All hail thy palaces and tow'rs", and some other works.

=== Festival City ===
This name originates from the number of festivals which are held in the city notably the Edinburgh International Festival and Edinburgh Fringe Festival.

=== Other nicknames ===
Ben Jonson described it as Britaine's other eye, and Sir Walter Scott referred to the city as yon Empress of the North.

Other Scots dialect variants include Embra, or Embro and Edinburrie.

== Bibliography ==
- Blackie, Christina (1887), Geographical Etymology: A Dictionary of Place-names Giving their Derivations, John Murray, ISBN 0-7083-0465-6
- Chadwick, Nora K. (1968), The British Heroic Age: the Welsh and the Men of the North, University of Wales Press, ISBN 0-7083-0465-6
- Dumville, David (1995), "The eastern terminus of the Antonine wall: 12th- or 13th-century evidence" (PDF), Proceedings of the Society of Antiquaries of Scotland, 124: 293–298, doi:10.9750/PSAS.124.293.298, S2CID 159974303, archived from the original (PDF) on 15 May 2012.
- Gelling, Margaret; W. F. H. Nicolaisen; Melville Richards (1970). The Names of Towns and Cities in Britain. Batsford. ISBN 0-7134-5235-8.
- Jackson, Kenneth H. (1969), The Gododdin: The Oldest Scottish Poem, Edinburgh University Press, pp. 77–78, ISBN 9780852240496
- Williams, Ifor (1972), The Beginnings of Welsh Poetry: Studies, University of Wales Press, ISBN 0-7083-0035-9
- Room, Adrian (2006). Placenames of the World. McFarland. ISBN 0-7864-2248-3.
