= Gwrgi Garwlwyd =

Fictional Welsh warrior

Gwrgi Garwlwyd ("Man-Dog Rough-Grey") is a warrior character in Welsh Arthurian legend. He appears in the poem Pa gur and in the Welsh Triads as a fierce warrior, and may have been seen as a werewolf.

== Accounts ==
In Pa Gur, King Arthur and his men fight against an army of cinbin, or dogheads, at the mountains of Eidyn (modern Edinburgh). In the next passage, Arthur's men fight Garwlwyd ("Rough-Grey") in the Battle of Tryfrwyd, possibly a second fight against the monsters. Arthur's warrior Bedwyr (later known as Bedivere) spars with Garwlwyd, evidently their champion.

Welsh Triads 10W and 32 feature Gwrgi Garwlwyd ("Man-Dog" "Rough-Grey"), who can be identified with the character from Pa gur. He is described as a menace who killed one Briton every day, and two on Saturday to avoid killing on Sunday. His death at the hands of Diffeidell mab Dissynyndawd, a bard and chieftain of Deira and Bernicia, is regarded as one of the "Three Fortunate Slayings". Scholar Rachel Bromwich notes the similarity of Gwrgi Garwlwyd's name to Germán Garbglas, an enemy of Cú Chulainn in the Ulster Cycle of Irish mythology, and suggests that they may both have been conceived as werewolves.
