= Saint Mercurius slaying Julian the Apostate (St. George church, Struga) =

Religious icon

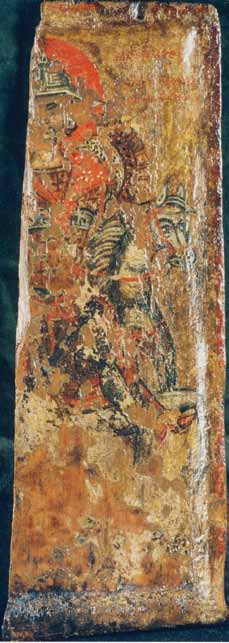
- Year: 15th century
- Location: Struga

Saint Mercurius slaying Julian the Apostate is an icon found in the St. George's church in Struga. It is the third in a row on this topic in the Ohrid region, North Macedonia.

Faced with the upper part of the body, Saint Mercurius, with a cinnabar halo, triumphantly rides a white horse, who with a whirling mane lifts his hooves upon the emperor Julian "the Apostate". Hit by the spear, the fallen emperor can only be seen in the lower right corner. Mercurius is depicted in a leather armor with a metal gambeson; a cinnamon chlamys with pearl ornaments, tied by a large knot on the chest; a short green tunic; blue socks with black and red hinges and ocher shoes; a metal helmet with wide visor and long feather on top; a circular shield, profiled along the outer edge and a black vase motif on the white center field; a sword and a bow with an arrow in obscure fragments to the body. In the upper right corner, a Slavic inscription in three lines, written with cinnabar on the ocher background, describes the content: "Мерькоурï[е] /велïкï [по]корьï /..с…в.ïтек" ("Mercurius/great conqueror/..с…в.ïтек")

In addition to the sense of composition and proportions, the iconographer's painting process is characterized by a deep dark, often black line. The image is painted on a light ocher with olive shades, cinnamon accentuated on the cheeks, nose and mouth, as well as a white weight on the face and neck. The physiognomic features of the saint with a full cheek face, curly hair up to the ears, short dark beard and mustache, as well as the modeling of his helmet, direct the closest analogies to the Church of the Assumption of the Most Holy Mother of God in Velestovo, near Ohrid, more precisely towards the image of St. Mercurius painted in 1444. However, the duct of the letters from the Struga icon has greater similarities with the Velest inscription from 1450/51, or with those of the younger frescoes in the church of St. Constantine and Helena, so there is reason to believe that the anonymous author of the icon was associated with Ohrid around the middle of the 15th century.
