= Ahrakas and Augani =

Ahrakas and Augani (also spelt "Ahraqas" and "Oghani") are saints in the Egyptian Coptic Christian tradition. They are the companions or bodyguards of Saint Mercurius, and are portrayed as cenocephalic (dog-headed).

They are known from an 18th-century icon in the Coptic Museum, Cairo, attributed to Ibrahim Al-Nassikh.

According to legend,

Two cynocephali devoured the grandfather of St. Mercurius, and were preparing to eat his father when an angel appeared and surrounded them with a ring of fire. They repented and became companions of the father, and later accompanied Mercurius into battle.

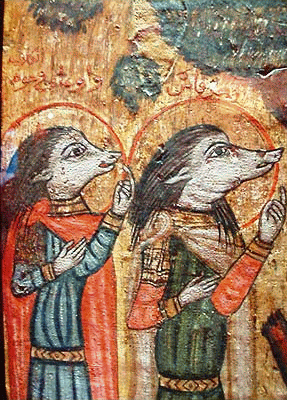
Detail from an icon held in the Coptic Museum, Cairo

== Sources ==
Sources referenced by Danijela Stefanović:

- R. Basset, Le Synaxaire arabe jacobite (rédaction copte): les mois de Hatour et de Kihak, Patrologia Orientalis 3, 1909, 337–338
- A. Piankoff, Deux Saints à la tête du chien, Bulletin de la Société d’Archéologie Copte 12, 1947, 57–61
- A. Piankoff, Saint Mercure, Abou Seifein et les Cynocéphales, Bulletin de la Société d’Archéologie Copte 8, 1942, 17–24
- O. F. A. Meinardus, Über den armenischen Ursprung der Kynokephaloi-Ikone im Koptischen Museum zu Alt-Kairo, Journal of Coptic Studies 2, 1992, 91–98
