= Psoglav =

Demonic creature in Balkan mythology

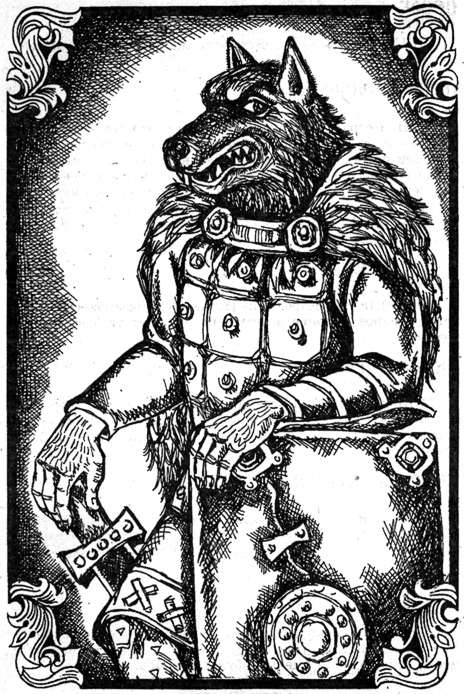
Psoglav.

Psoglav (Serbian Cyrillic: Псоглав, literally "doghead") is a demonic mythical creature in Balkan mythology; belief about it existed in parts of Bosnia and Montenegro. Psoglav was described as having a human body with horse legs, a dog's head with iron teeth, and a single eye on the forehead.

Psoglavs were described as living in caves or in a dark land which has plenty of gemstones, but no sun. They practice anthropophagy, by eating people, or even digging out corpses from graves to eat them. In Croatian the term is psoglavac, and in Slovene it is psoglavec. There are numerous legends about them, particularly on the Istrian peninsula in Croatia.

== See also ==
- Cynocephaly
- Ghoul
