= Qutrub =

Type of jinn or demon

A qutrub (قُطْرُب) in Arabian folklore is a type of jinn or demon, likened to an "Arabian 'werewolf'", similar to a ghoul because it was said to haunt graveyards and eat corpses.

== See also ==
- Cynocephaly
- Sila
