= Wulver =

Type of werewolf in Shetland folklore

The wulver or wullver is a kind of wolf-like humanoid creature in the folklore of the Shetland Islands of Scotland. In modern times, the origin of the wulver has been disputed.

== History ==
The wulver is said by the Shetland folklorist Jessie Saxby to be benevolent, although later accounts state that they became violent if provoked. They were generally friendly to locals, however, and were known to share the fish they caught with them. They were usually described as looking like furry people with the head of a wolf. Some accounts claim they were never human to begin with.

Saxby, in Shetland Traditional Lore writes:

The Wulver was a creature like a man with a wolf's head. He had short brown hair all over him. His home was a cave dug out of the side of a steep knowe, half-way up a hill. He didn't molest folk if folk didn't molest him. He was fond of catching and eating fish, and had a small rock in the deep water which is known to this day as the "Wulver's Stane". There he would sit fishing sillaks and piltaks for hour after hour. He was reported to have frequently left a few fish on the window-sill of some poor body.

In previous publications, Saxby spelled the word as "wullver."

== Interpretations ==
After researching folklore traditions gathered primarily from Gaelic areas of Scotland, an authority on congenital disorders, Susan Schoon Eberly, has speculated that the tale of the wulver may have its basis in humans suffering a medical condition; possibly Hunter syndrome or lycanthropy, she suggests. This theoretical basis of wulver lore has been criticised as not useful, or, especially, reliable, particularly given a lack of any surviving detailed description of the wulver; the malleable and shifting nature of oral traditions; and the existence of other, analogous, mythological creatures in many folklore traditions (suggesting that tales of such creatures are likely to spontaneously arise in many places).

Others, such as the Shetland Museum archivist Brian Smith, argue that the wulver is an entirely fictitious creation that was never part of Shetland folklore, contending the creature is solely the creation of Saxby. The proponents of this view argue that Saxby, whether intentionally or in error, misinterpreted the meaning of a name in her sources. In this interpretation, Jakob Jakobsen and John Spence had mentioned a hill called Wulvers Hool in their writings, which they translated as "Fairy Hill" due to the á- element in the Old Norse word álf having become a wu- element as part of the development of the Shetland dialect. Saxby would have afterwards interpreted the name to refer to a distinct entity and created the wulver legend, writing about it as if belief in such a creature had always existed in Shetland folklore.
