= Saint Mercurius =

Greek soldier and martyr (220s–250)

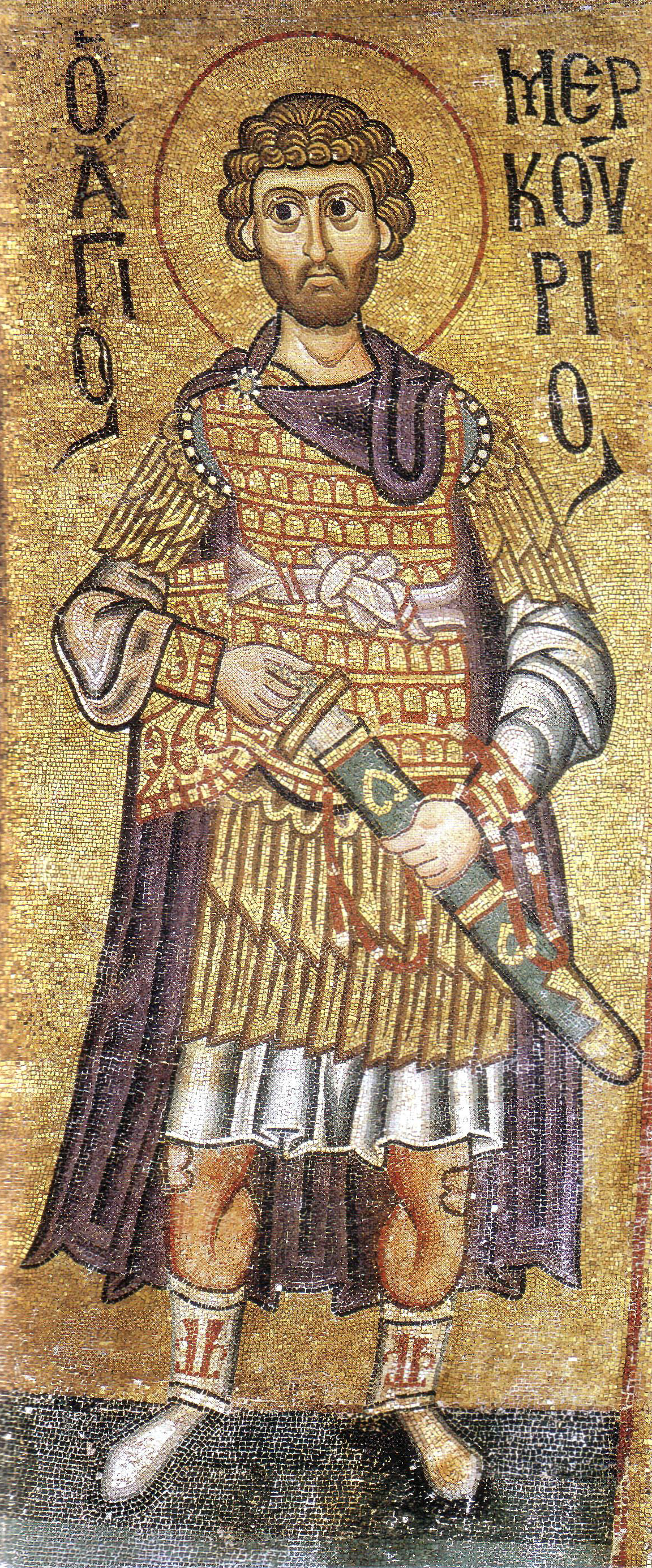
- Mosaic of Saint Mercurius inside the Hosios Loukas Monastery, Greece.

Great martyr
- Born: 224/225; Cappadocia (Roman Empire; modern-day Turkey)
- Died: December 4, 250 (aged 25–26)
- Venerated in: Roman Catholic Church; Eastern Orthodox Church; Oriental Orthodox Churches
- Canonized: pre-congregation
- Feast: 25 November (Roman Catholic Church); 25 November (Eastern Orthodox Church); 25 Hathor/4-5 December (Martyrdom), 9 Paoni/16-17 June (Translation of relics), 25 Epip/1-2 August (Feast) (Coptic Orthodox Church)
- Attributes: Paramerion swords

Mercurius (Greek: Ἅγιος Μερκούριος, Coptic: Ⲫⲓⲗⲟⲡⲁⲧⲏⲣ Ⲙⲉⲣⲕⲟⲩⲣⲓⲟⲥ, Ge'ez: መርቆሬዎስ, Syriac: ܡܳܪܩܘ̇ܪܝܘ̇ܣ; 224/225 – 250 AD) was a Roman soldier who became a Christian saint and martyr. He is venerated in several Christian traditions, including the Greek Orthodox Church. According to Greek hagiographical tradition, he was of Scythian descent. He was born in Cappadocia, in Asia Minor (modern-day Turkey). According to Christian tradition, he was the soldier who killed Julian the Apostate during his campaign in Persia. Mercurius was also widely known by his Arabic-language name Abu-Sayfain, Abu-Sifin or Abu-Sefein in Egyptian Arabic (Arabic: أبو سيفين, romanized: Abū Seifēn; Coptic: ⲁⲃⲩⲥⲉⲫⲁⲓⲛ, romanized: Abû-Sefaīn) which means "wielder of two swords", referring to the second sword given to him by the Archangel Michael.

Mercurius was born around 225 AD in Cappadocia (Asia Minor). According to Greek hagiographical accounts, his father was named Gordianus and was a Scythian. His parents were converts to Christianity and they called him "Philopateer" or "Philopatyr" (a Greek name which means 'Lover of the Father'). They raised him in a Christian manner. When he grew to adulthood (at the age of 17), he enlisted in the Roman army in the reign of Emperor Decius. He gained a great reputation among his superiors as a swordsman and a tactician in many battles.

== Traditional biography ==
=== Family ===
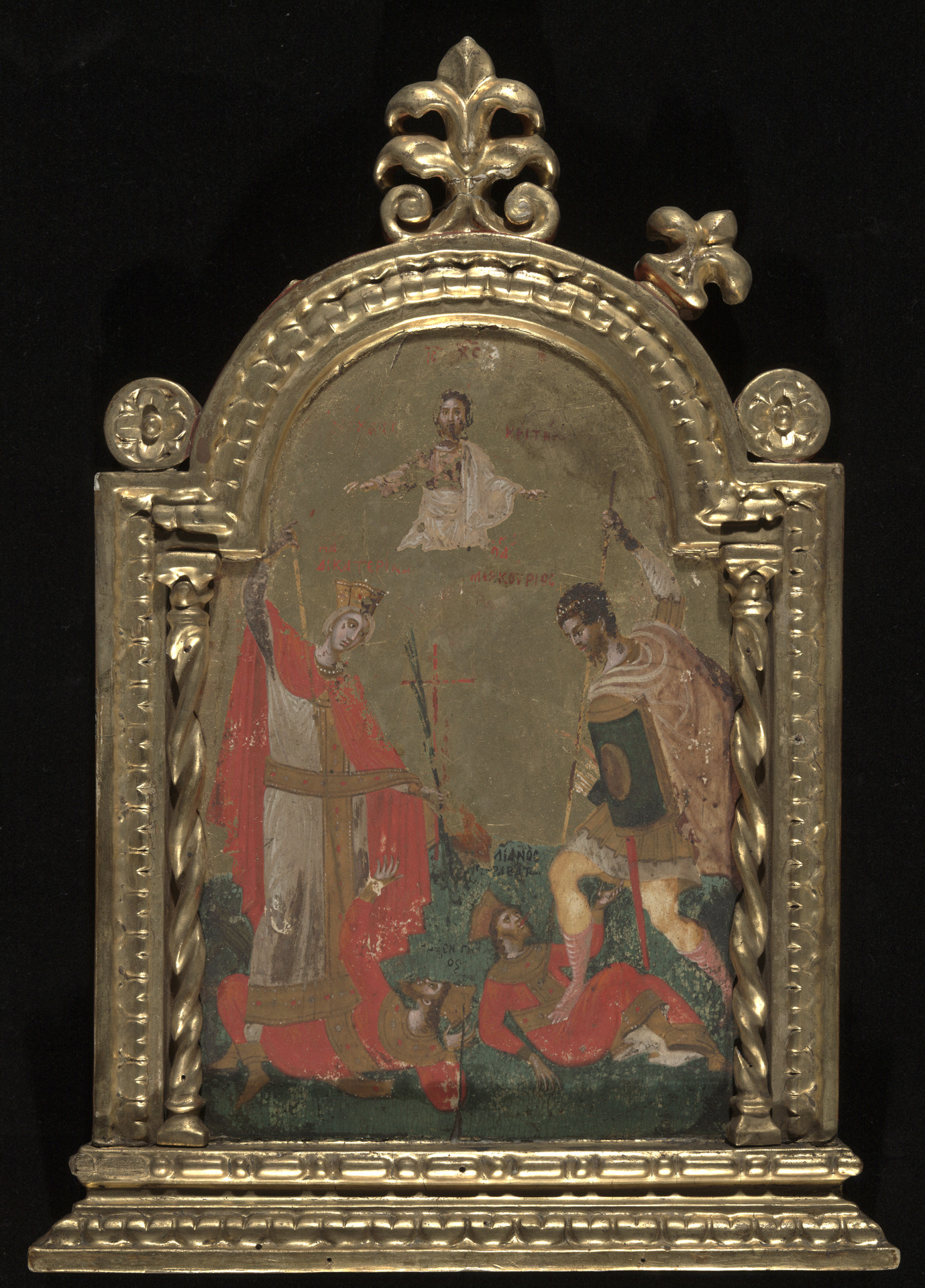
Icon of Christ appearing to Saints Mercurius and Catherine of Alexandria in the act of tyrannicide, Yale University Art Gallery, Connecticut, United States

According to the Greek Orthodox Archdiocese of America, Saint Mercurius came from Cappadocia.

According to Coptic Accounts, Mercurius was the son of Yares, an officer in the Roman army. One day, while Yares was hunting in the forest with his father, the two were attacked by an animal. The animal jumped on Yares' father, causing Yares to faint. While Yares was unconscious, he had a vision with a brilliant light and a voice saying:

Yares, I am your God who loves you. I know that you have a good heart and that you hate the pagan idols. I want to inform you that your son, Philopatyr, will become like a tree bearing good fruits, and because of him, I will bless you and your wife. Philopatyr will be my witness and will defy all prejudice in my name.

Yares, his wife, and his son were baptized shortly after. All three were given new names. Yares became Noah, his wife became Saphina, and Mercurius became Philopater. News of their baptism spread quickly in the city and the prince ordered them to be arrested and thrown to wild animals. However, the animals did not harm them and the prince decided to release Noah and his family. When the Barbarians attacked, Noah went to fight them. He was taken prisoner and was brought to their territory, where he was kept for seventeen months. When the war finally ended, he went back to his city and joined his family, but died shortly after.

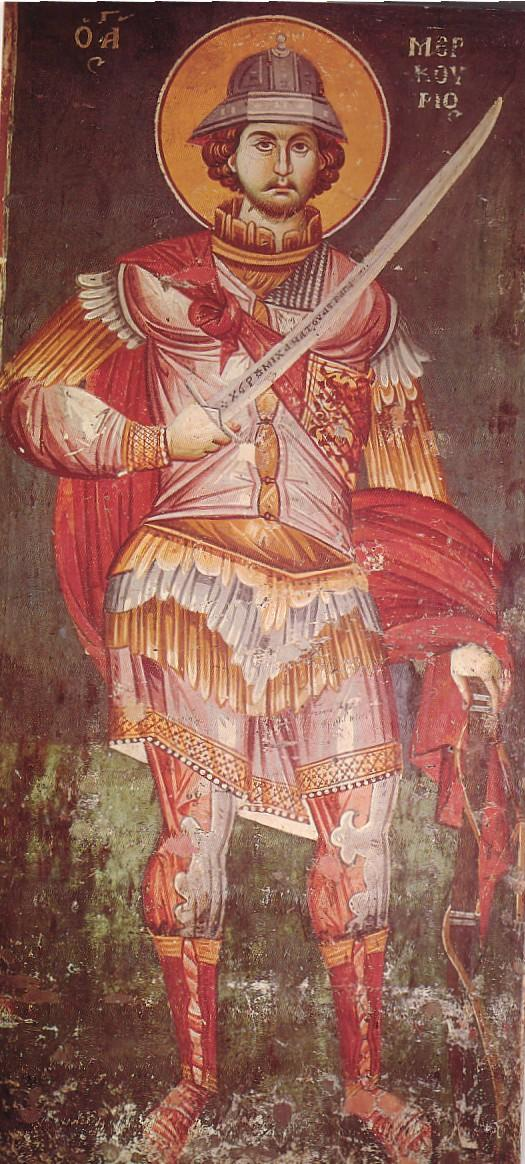
A Byzantine Greek fresco of Saint Mercurius, dated 1295, from Ohrid, North Macedonia

=== Military career ===
After the death of Mercurius' father Noah, the pagan Roman Emperor Decius (ruled 249–251) chose him to replace his father. Described as very strong and courageous, Mercurius earned the respect of his fellow soldiers and gained renown as a swordsman. When barbarians attacked Rome, Decius went out to fight them but became afraid when he saw how many there were. Mercurius then came to him and said, "Do not be afraid, because God will kill our enemies and will bring us victory."

After several days of fighting, the Archangel Michael appeared to Mercurius holding a shining sword. Mercurius took the sword from the archangel, hence the name Abu Sayfain —- "the father of two swords": a military sword and a divine sword. He conquered the barbarians. When Decius heard news of the triumphant victory, he named Mercurius as a prince.

=== Martyrdom ===
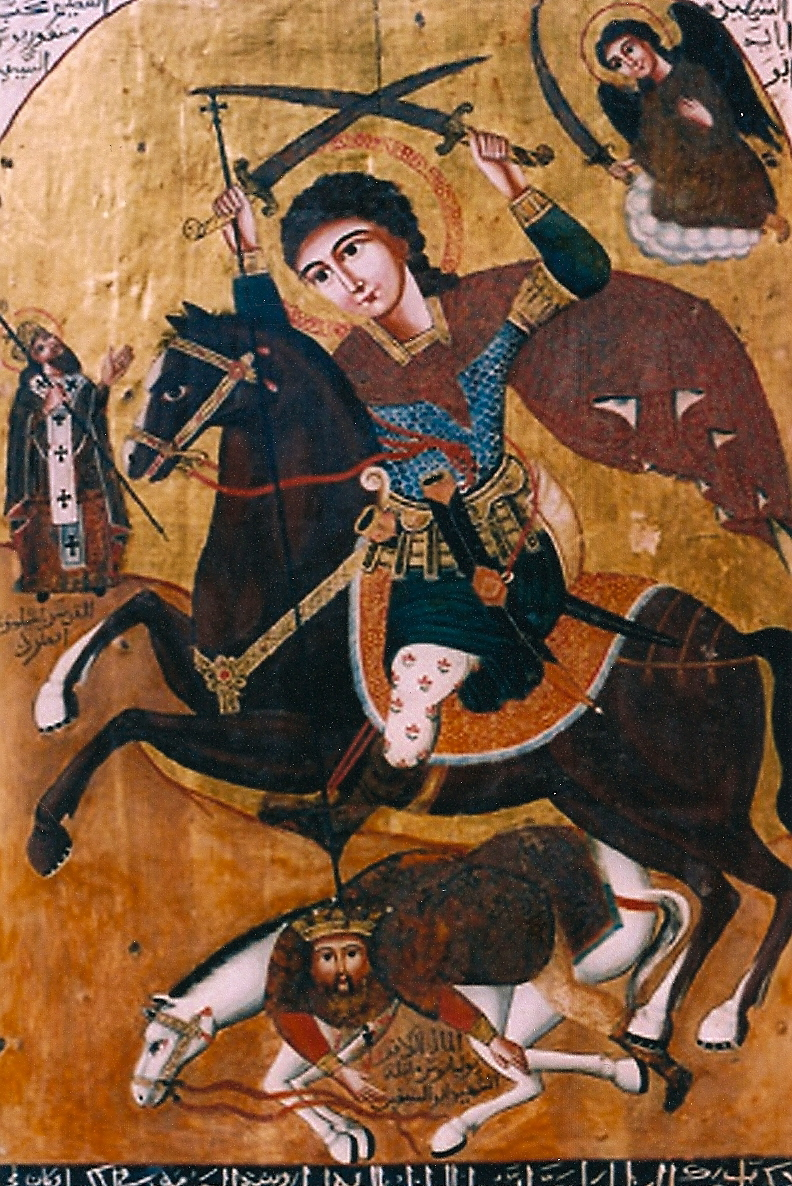
Coptic Icon of St Mercurius by Yuhanna al-Armani in The Hanging Church, Cairo.

Nonetheless, in 249 AD, Decius began his persecution of Christians, compelling everyone to offer sacrifices to his pagan gods. The Archangel Michael appeared to Mercurius and told him to remember God and not be fearful of persecution. Mercurius was encouraged and spent the whole night praying fervently, confessing his weakness to God.

The emperor sent messengers to summon Mercurius to the palace, saying: "Dear Mercurius, let us go offer incense to the gods who helped us attain victory in the war." As they were leaving, Mercurius slipped through the crowd and went away. However, one of the guards reported his absence, and the emperor called Mercurius and asked him: "Is it true that you refused to worship the idols who helped us during the war?" Mercurius declared himself a Christian, saying, "I do not worship anyone except my Lord and my God, Jesus Christ."

The emperor tried to persuade him to give up his faith but failed. He then ordered Mercurius to be stripped of his rank and tortured. Fearing a revolt because the people loved Mercurius, the emperor had him bound in iron fetters and sent him to Caesarea. Mercurius was beheaded on 4 December 250 AD. He was only 25 years old.

== Other traditions ==
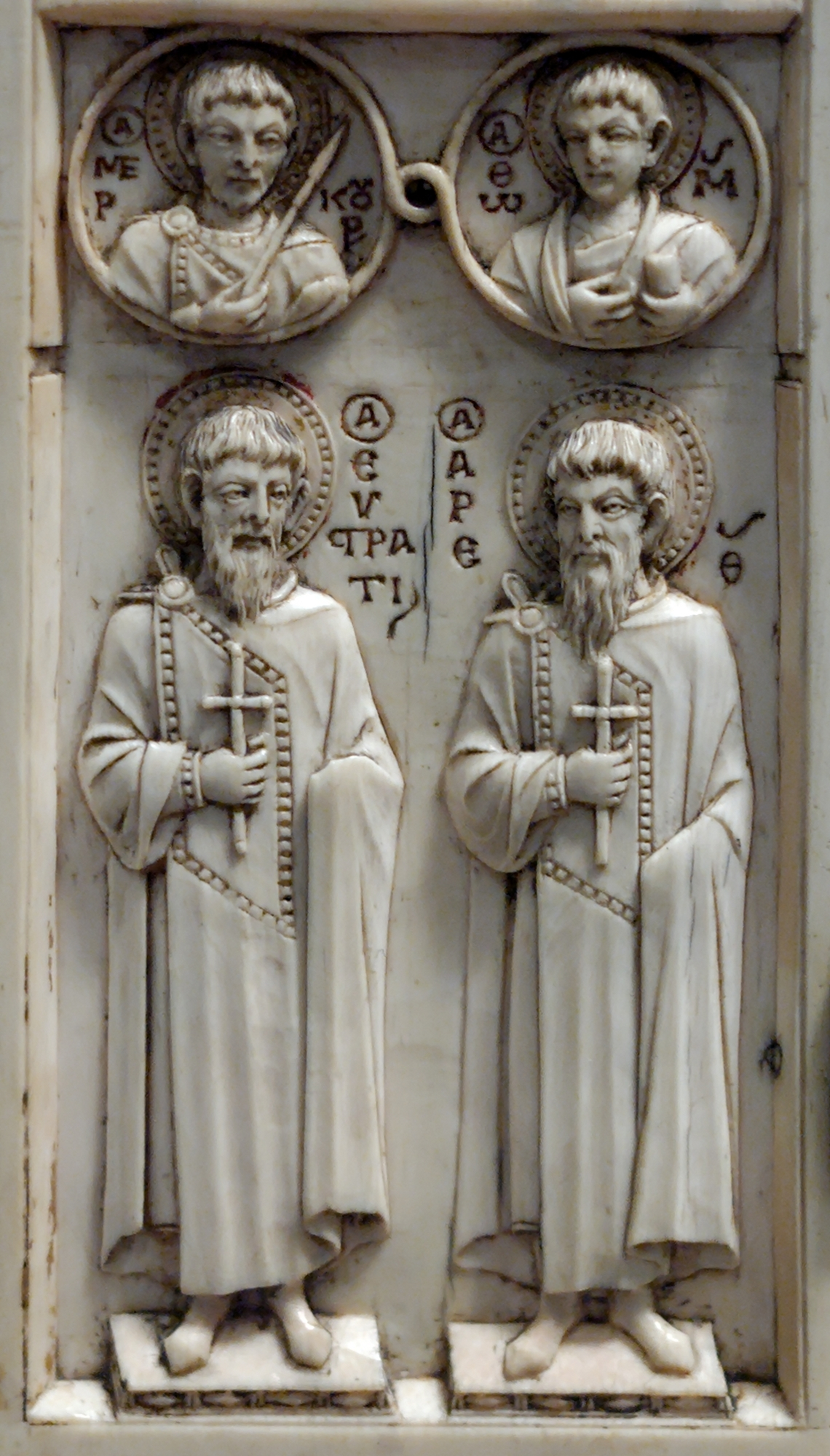
Saint Arethas and Saint Eustratius, with Mercurius and Thomas the Apostle in the roundels (from the Harbaville Triptych)

After the end of the first persecution, the place of Mercurius's burial was revealed. Mercurius appeared to a poor man in the city and told him that he was "Mercurius, the Martyr of the Lord" and that "my body is buried in Cappadocia Gardens, under the old house on the way to the royal palace. My body looks as white as snow, because Jesus was present at the time of my martyrdom."

The next morning, the man went to dig under the old house. He began to smell the scent of perfume, seeing the body of Mercurius. The news spread quickly and many people came to take a look at the blessed body. They moved it temporarily to the local church until they built a new church bearing his name where Mercurius' body was buried with respect and devotion.

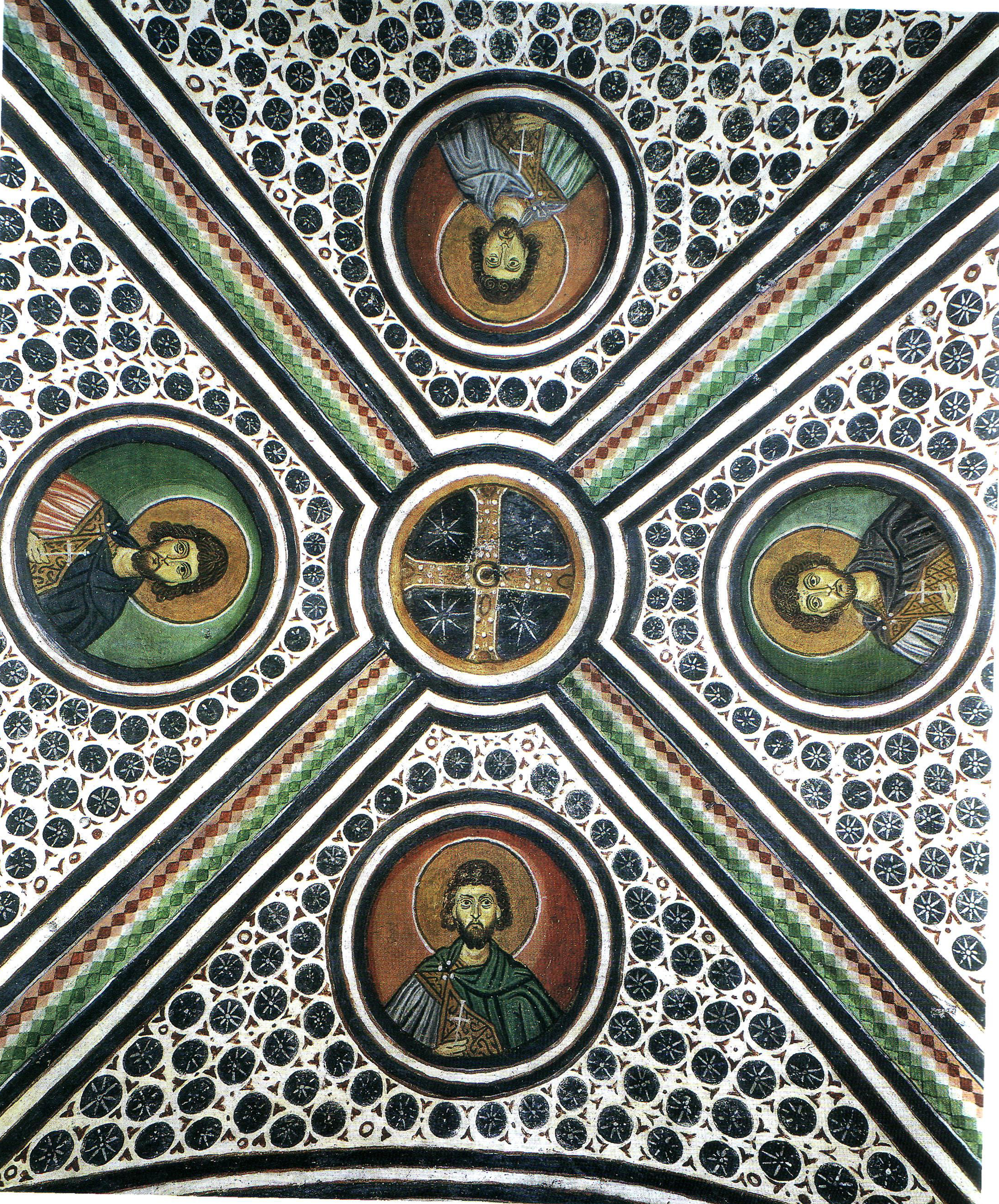
Mosaic depicting St. Mercurius Abu-Sifin, Hosios Loukas Monastery, Boeotia, Greece

A few years later, the Catholicos of Armenia and the Chief bishop of the Armenian Apostolic Church, visited Egypt and met with the Patriarch of Alexandria, the leader of the Coptic Orthodox Church. The latter asked him if Egypt could have part of the relics of Saint Mercurius to be placed in the church that bears his name in Egypt. On 9 Paoni (16 June), part of the blessed relics of Saint Mercurius were transferred to Egypt.

According to one tradition, Basil once prayed before an icon on which Mercurius was portrayed as a soldier carrying a spear. He asked God not to permit the emperor Julian the Apostate (361-363) to return from his war against the Persians and resume his oppression of Christians. The image of the holy Great Martyr Mercurius depicted on the icon became invisible, only to reappear later with a bloodied spear. Julian the Apostate, on his Persian campaign, was mortally wounded by the spear of an unknown Saracen soldier.

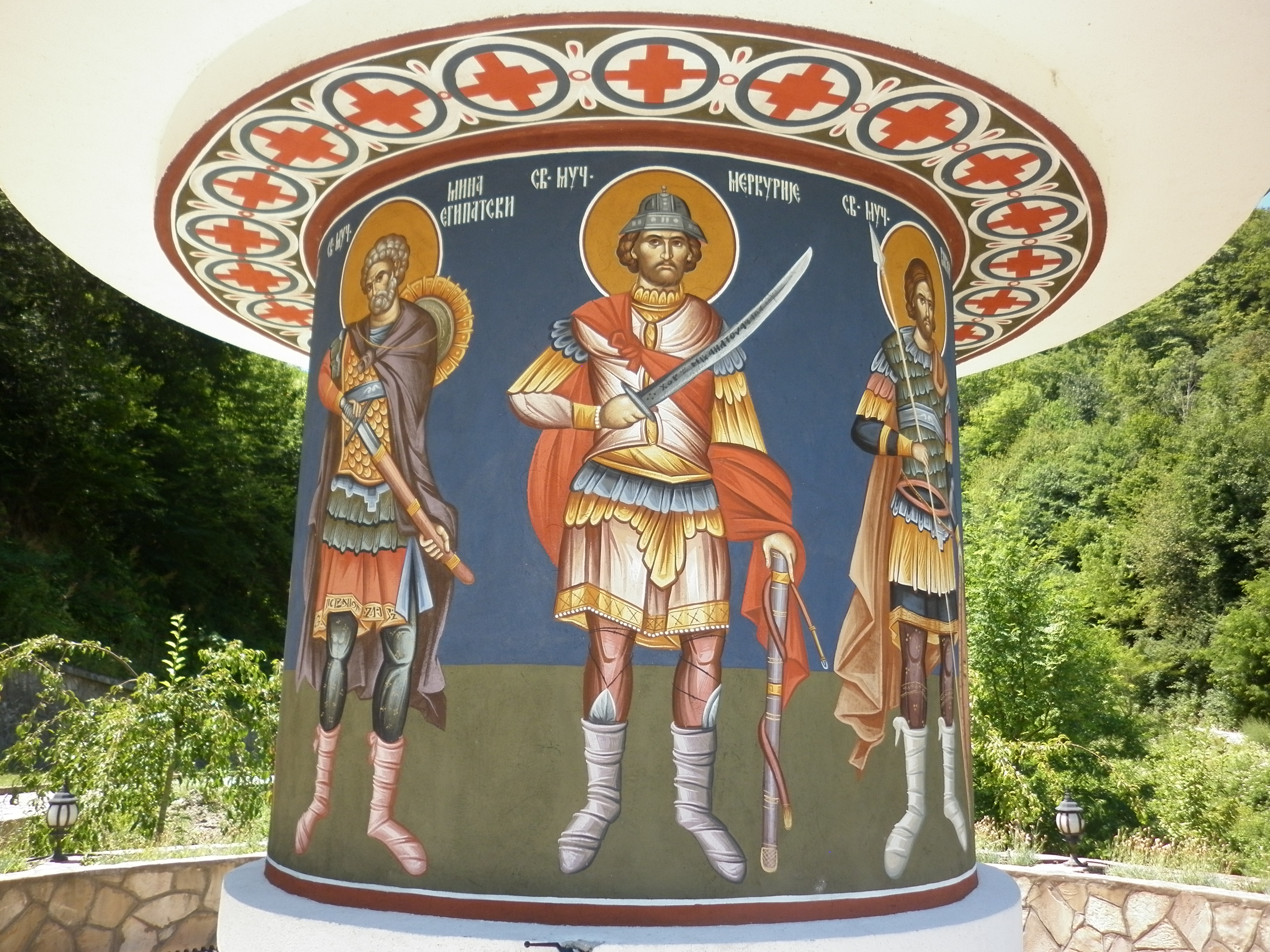
Fresco depicting St. Mercurius Abu-Sifin (center), Sase Monastery, Bratunac, Bosnia

Modern folklore holds that the nuns of Abu Sefein Monastery in Cairo credit the saint's intercession with preventing the confiscating of their property for the Ministry of Defense. Legend has it the abbess, Tamav Irini, had prayed to Abu Sefein. Saint Mercurius appeared in a vision to Egyptian President Hosni Mubarak; the government reversed its decision and locals claim Mubarak became a crypto-Christian afterwards.

== See also ==
- Acts of Andrew and Bartholomew
- Saint Mercurius slaying Julian the Apostate (St. George church, Struga) - icon
- Ahrakas and Augani
