= Iddog ap Mynio =

Character of Welsh legend

Iddog ap Mynio, also known as Iddog Cordd Prydain, is a character in the early Welsh tale The Dream of Rhonabwy. He was the messenger at the Battle of Camlann and, in a bid to halt peace talks, twisted both Arthur's and Medrawd's words so as to cause strife between them. It was as a result of his actions that the battle was waged. As a result, he was given the nickname Iddog, Agitator of Britain

Iddog did penance at Y Llech Las for seven years to recompense for this act before being shown mercy by Arthur and accepted into his retinue once again. He serves under Arthur during an unnamed battle against the Saxons and befriends Rhonabwy, a warrior from Powys.
