= Elmet (disambiguation) =

Elmet (or Elfed) was a sub-Roman, Brythonic kingdom in the north of England.

Elmet may also refer to:

- Elmet (UK Parliament constituency), 1983–2010
- Elmet and Rothwell (UK Parliament constituency), 2010–present
- Elmet (novel), a 2017 novel by Fiona Mozley

== See also ==
- Remains of Elmet, a 1979 poetry collection by Ted Hughes
- Elfed (disambiguation), the modern Welsh form of the name Elmet
- Helmet
