= Elfed =

Elfed is a Welsh-language place name and personal name. It commonly refers to one of two geographic areas:

- The kingdom of Elmet, a British kingdom in what is now northern England in the Early Middle Ages
- Elfed, a commote of Cantref Gwarthaf in Carmarthenshire, Wales, later anglicised to Elvet Hundred

Elfed may also refer to:

- Cynwyl Elfed, a community in the historical commote of Elfed
- Elfed High School, in Buckley, Flintshire, Wales

== As a personal name or pseudonym ==
- Elfed Davies, Baron Davies of Penrhys (1913–1992), Welsh politician
- Elfed Evans (1926–1988), Welsh footballer
- Howell Elvet Lewis (1860–1953), Welsh hymn-writer, poet and archdruid, whose bardic name was Elfed
- Elfed Morris (born 1942), Welsh footballer
- Elfed Williams (born 1963), Welsh politician

== See also ==
- Elmet (disambiguation)
