= St Dwywe's Church =

Church in Llanddwywe, Gwynedd, Wales

Coordinates: 52.7800°N 4.0972°W

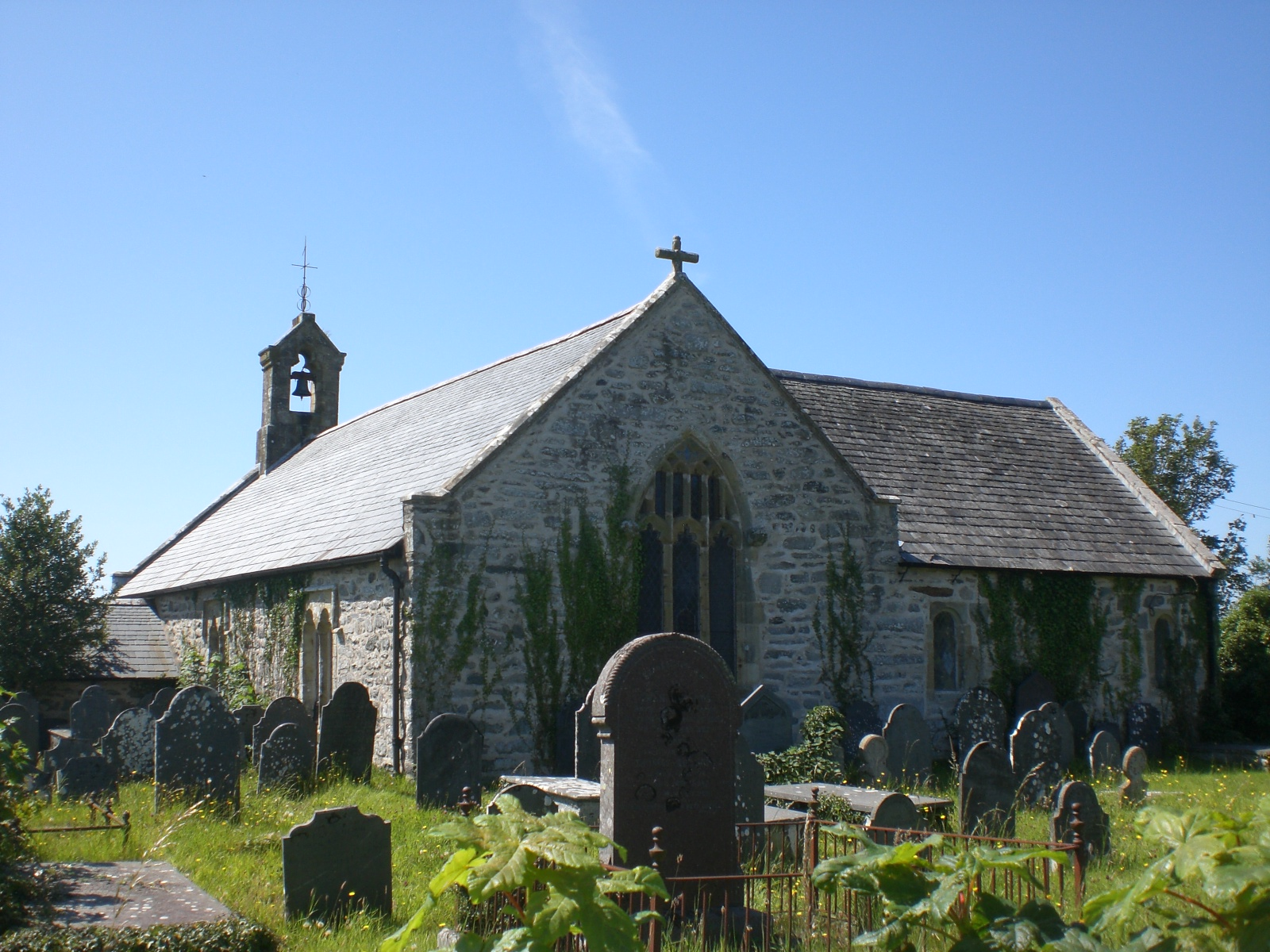
West side of Saint Dwywe's church, Llanddwywe

St Dwywe’s Church is a Grade II* listed church in Llanddwywe, Gwynedd, North Wales.

It has a curvilinear churchyard and farm buildings on its west. Its structure, of rubble stone construction, is mainly of late medieval and early modern date, the church having first been mentioned in documents dating to 1292–1293.

It is named for Saint Dwywe ferch Gwallog, a pre-congregational saint of Wales; She was born a princess in Yorkshire between 465 and 585, but forced to flee from war to family in Wales. She may have been the wife of Saint Dynod Bwr and the mother of Saint Deiniol (after whom Bangor Cathedral was named) and possibly of Cynwyl, Gwarthan, and Aneirin.
