= Dwywe =

5th- or 6th-century Welsh saint

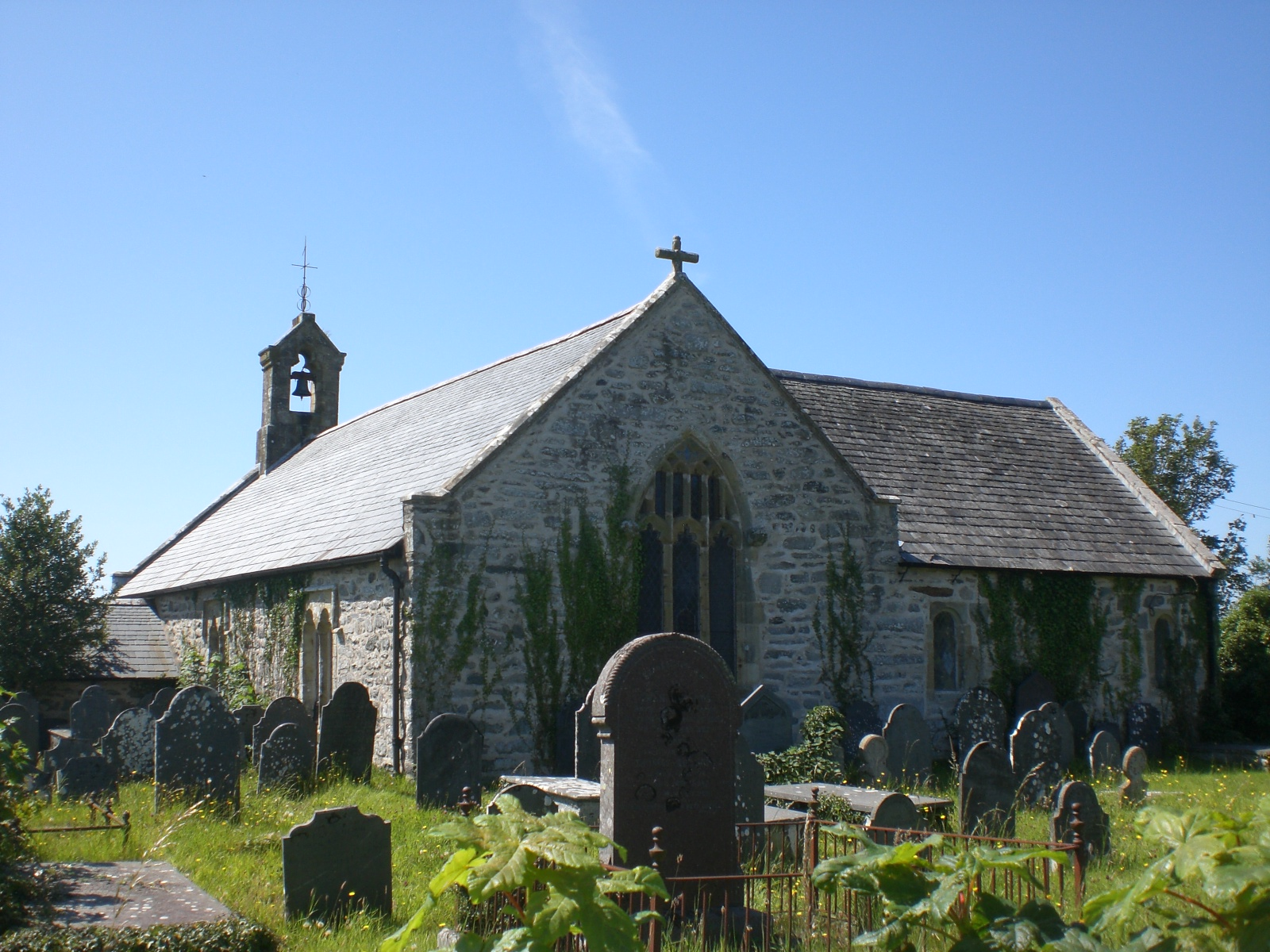
West side of St Dwywe's Church, Llanddwywe, Gwynedd

Saint Dwywe was a 5th- or 6th-century pre-congregational saint of Wales. She was a native of the ancient Cumbric-speaking kingdoms, which stretched from south-western Scotland down as far as South Yorkshire, and is estimated to have been born between 465 and 585.

She may have been the wife of Dunawd Fyr and mother of a son, Saint Deiniol, who founded monasteries on Deeside and at Bangor. She may also have been the mother of Cynwyl ap Dynod, Gwarthan ap Dynod and Aneirin.

She is remembered in a church of St Dwywe. She was a princess, the daughter of Gwallog ap Lleenog of the royal house based in the Kingdom of Elmet, east and south of Leeds. Her father and the family were forced to flee after a war against the Angles of Bernicia (who were based around Northumberland and Durham). They were taken in by Welsh kinsfolk and settled near Barmouth.
