= Gwallog ap Llênog =

Sixth-century Brythonic monarch

King of Elfed?
- Reign: c. mid 6th century
- Successor: Ceredig?
- Issue: Ceredig?; 'Onnen Greg'
- House: Coeling?
- Father: Llênog ap Maeswig Gloff

Gwallog ap Llênog (Welsh: [ˈɡwaɬɔɡ ap ˈɬeːnɔɡ], Old Welsh: Guallauc map Laenauc) was possibly a sixth-century ruler of Elfed, a region in the wider area memorialised in later Welsh literature as the 'Old North'. The evidence for Gwallog's existence survives entirely from two poems of spurious date and several other references in semi-legendary genealogies and literature well beyond his era. If this later material is to be believed, he was a member of the Coeling, a family which is supposed to have been prominent across several kingdoms in northern Britain in the sixth century. He is probably best remembered for his role in the Historia Brittonum as an ally of Urien Rheged. As with many figures of this period, he attracted much interest in later Medieval Welsh literature.

== Life ==
Our only possibly contemporary source for Gwallog's life comes from two Middle Welsh poems honouring him attributed to Taliesin by modern scholarship. Though both poems survive in a fourteenth-century manuscript, one of the poems may date to Gwallog's period based on an archaic feature of the text. The first poem is a praise to Gwallog, and the second is an elegy memorialising him after his burial. There is very little biographical information in either of these poems, as they reference places and figures about which no corroborating evidence survives, neither contemporaneously nor in later sources. Nevertheless, it is said that Gwallog fought in battles all around northern Britain, against Picts, Strathclyde, the English, and Gwynedd. The second poem to him, his elegy, calls him the son of Llênog, and yields a connection to Elfed, since he is called ygnat ac (read ar) eluet 'judge over Elfed'. Nothing is said about his manner or cause of death. Shortly after Gwallog's period, a probably contemporaneous poem to Cadwallon ap Cadfan claims that 'fierce Gwallog caused the greatly renowned death toll at Catraeth'. Because of this, John Koch hypothesises that Gwallog may have therefore been on the winning side of that battle, with the cause of the battle being that his rule over Elfed threatened by a claimant, Madog Elfed.

== Later material concerning Gwallog ==
=== Harleian Genealogies and the Historia Brittonum ===
The genealogies from Harley MS 3859 (c. 850-950 AD), primarily concerned with northern Brythonic dynasties, give Gwallog's patrilineal descent as 'Gwallog son of Llênog son of Maeswig Gloff son of Cenau son of Coel Hen'. That Coel was truly the progenitor of these dynasties, however, is a matter of ongoing academic debate, since the only testimonies of this common descent are from texts written in Wales hundreds of years after the kingdoms they represent disappear from the historical record. Nevertheless, if the genealogies are true, it would make Gwallog a distant cousin of Urien Rheged. Next to nothing is known about Gwallog's father Llênog, who may have been the eponymous founder of a (possibly monastic) settlement called Llanllennog, the location of which is entirely unknown.

The other document of historical interest found in Harley 3859 is the Historia Brittonum. This text is a composite narrative cobbled together from Bede and other, lost sources, created in Gwynedd in 829 AD. In it, a series of events are connected to the reigns of various Northumbrian kings. Gwallog occurs in a section dated to the reign of Theodric of Bernicia (d. c. 572 x 593), where he, together with Urien, Rhydderch Hen, and Morgan, are recorded as fighting against that Anglian king. Gwallog is only mentioned in one sentence of this narrative, however, and it is unknown what other involvement he had in this campaign. According to the narrative, the four besieged Theodric on Lindisfarne, but the alliance dissolved when Urien was slain by Morgan. This is perhaps because Lindisfarne was situated near Morgan's territory, and so Morgan felt threatened by Urien's power more than that of the weakened Theodric.

=== Role in "saga poetry" ===
Like many of the figures associated with fifth- and sixth-century Brythonic-speaking territories in Britain, Gwallog becomes a figure in the later Welsh literature about the 'Old North'. The historical value of these literary sources is doubtful, as are all to be dated even at their most conservative estimates around the same period as the Historia Brittonum. The chronologically earliest pieces of literature traditionally dated around the same time as the Historia Brittonum are called "saga poems", so named by comparison with Icelandic sagas, since it is thought that these poems originally were featured in longer oral or prose stories, much like the poems in the Norse texts. Like the Norse texts, these poems could be of historical value, but it is difficult to discern fact from fiction in their contents. It is doubly difficult with this material, as its diction and 'narrative' are extremely obscure.

One group of poems in the "saga" literature is called the 'Urien Rheged' cycle by modern scholars, as the poems are concerned with the events in Rheged after the slaying of Urien. The poems survive from the Black Book of Carmarthen (c. 1250), the Red Book of Hergest (after 1382), and various other later copies. Nevertheless, they are traditionally understood to be copies of Old Welsh material. The narrative of the poems suggests Urien's kingdom was beset with enemies after his death, and Gwallog is among them. One poem states that 'Gwallog, horseman in battle, intended to make corpses in Erechwydd against the onslaught of Elffin [ab Urien]'.

There are two other obscure poems from the Black Book which reference Gwallog as well. The date of these is, however, very uncertain. Despite Urien's great reputation in Welsh literature and Gwallog's apparent hostility to Urien's heirs, in one poem, Gwallog is memorialised among other heroes as an attwod lloegir 'affliction of England'. The other poem refers to a lost story about Gwallog losing one of his eyes to a goose, though it is apparently not meant to be a humorous tale, despite how it may appear to the modern reader.

=== Welsh Triads, Arthuriana, and later genealogies ===
Like many figures in this period, Gwallog features in the Welsh Triads, mnemonic devices employed by medieval Welsh poets and storytellers (cyfarwyddyd). Gwallog is recorded as a 'Pillar of Battle', though the details of why he might be called this moniker are lost. In Ystorya Gereint uab Erbin, a text of unclear relation to Érec et Énide, Gwallog is included as one of Arthur's 'best men'. Very late genealogies give Gwallog's sister as Dwywai ferch Llênog, mother of Deiniol, first bishop of Bangor; his daughter was supposed to have been Onnen Greg, married to one Meurig ab Idno, who is also mentioned in the saga poetry. Given the centuries between the saga literature and these genealogies, however, it is more likely that Gwallog's daughter and son-in-law are the creation of later genealogists familiar with the same material.
