= Ceretic of Elmet =

7th-century king in sub-Roman Britain

Ceretic of Elmet (or Ceredig ap Gwallog) was the last king of Elmet, a Britonnic kingdom that existed in the West Yorkshire area of Northern England in sub-Roman Britain.

Bede records that Hilda of Whitby (born 614), a member of the Deiran royal family, was taken to the court of King Ceretic, after fleeing from the Northumbrian usurper, Æthelfrith of Bernicia. Bede describes Ceretic as "King of the Britons", perhaps meaning just the Britons of that area. When Edwin of Deira returned to power in 617, Ceretic was expelled, supposedly due to complicity in the poisoning of Hilda's father Hereric, the nephew of Edwin, and his kingdom was annexed to the Kingdom of Northumbria. He is probably the Ceretic whose death is recorded in the Annales Cambriae in 616 (which should be corrected to 617 or soon afterwards). He is generally thought to be identical to Ceredig ap Gwallog, a 'Man of the North', whose father, Gwallog ap Lleenog, is associated with Elmet by the poet, Taliesin.
