= Calchfynydd =

Britonnic kingdom or sub-kingdom of sub-Roman Britain

Calchfynydd (Welsh calch "lime" + mynydd "mountain") was an obscure Britonnic kingdom or sub-kingdom of sub-Roman Britain. Its exact location is uncertain, although the name suggests somewhere in one of Great Britain's Chalk Groups and might refer to southern Scotland, the Cotswolds, or the Chilterns. Virtually nothing else definitive is known about it.

The name survives in the epithet of Cadrawd Calchfynydd, apparently a 6th-century ruler of the district. Welsh sources refer to Cadrawd as one of the Gwyr y Gogledd or 'Men of the North', suggesting the area was located somewhere in northern Britain. William Forbes Skene suggested an identification with Kelso (formerly Calchow) in southern Scotland. Rachel Bromwich agrees that Kelso or a similar location in the Hen Ogledd is most likely, while noting that Kenneth Jackson doubted this identification. Alistair Moffat in his history of Kelso supports this position, citing early references to "Chalchou," as well as the chalk area and Chalkheugh Terrace. John Morris placed it south of the realm of Urien of Rheged, "between Trent and Thames". Based at least in part on the forgeries of Iolo Morganwg, the Rev. Thomas Barns located Calchfynydd around Dunstable, however sources predating Iolo's time, notably 18th century antiquarian Henry Rowlands' Mona Antiqua Restaurata and David Powel's sixteenth century History of Wales, mention a connection with Dunstable through "Cadrod Calchfynydd" being Earl of Dunstable (a very anachronistic title) in the post-Roman period. Robert Owen placed the kingdom among the Cotswolds.

== Presumed rulers in the line of Cadrawd ==
- Cynwyd Cynwydion
- Cadrawd Calchfynydd
- Yspwys Mwyntyrch
- Mynan
