= Birthday Letters =

1998 poetry collection by Ted Hughes

- First edition (Faber & Faber, 1998)
- Author: Ted Hughes
- Language: English
- Genre: Poetry
- Publisher: Faber & Faber
- Publication date: 1998
- Publication place: United Kingdom
- Pages: 208
- ISBN: 0-571-19472-9

Birthday Letters is a 1998 poetry collection by English poet Ted Hughes. Released only months before Hughes's death, the collection won multiple prestigious literary awards, including the Whitbread Book of the Year, the Forward Poetry Prize for Best Collection, and the T. S. Eliot Prize for Poetry in 1999. This collection of eighty-eight poems is widely considered to be Hughes's most explicit response to the suicide of his estranged wife Sylvia Plath in 1963, and to their widely discussed, politicised, and "explosive" marriage. The cover of the first edition depicts artwork created by Ted Hughes and Sylvia Plath's daughter, Frieda.

== Background ==
Until the publication of "Birthday Letters" 35 years after Plath's suicide, Hughes had said and published nearly nothing about his relationship and life with Plath. Hughes had only explicitly mentioned Plath in his writings once prior to its publication, in the poem "Heptonstall Cemetery" from his 1979 collection Remains of Elmet. When it was discovered that he had infidelities while with Plath and had destroyed some of Plath's works after her death, some critics depicted him as a monster and Plath as a victim. In one instance, Hughes's name was chipped off from Plath's tombstone in Yorkshire.

The "Ted Hughes controversy" concerned his possible role in Plath's suicide and subsequent attempts at controlling the finished products of her poetry. The speculation resulted in extra-literary attention on Plath and Hughes and, consequently, their works as poets. Poems including "The Blue Flannel Suit" directly address their relationship, and many are directly addressed to Plath herself.

== Plath and Hughes's relationship ==
Hughes and Plath met for the first time on 25 February 1956, at a party in Cambridge. Plath had been studying in England on a government grant, and wanted to meet Hughes after being impressed with some of the poems she'd read in a magazine. The two quickly found interest in one another, going as far as sending poems back and forth with each other. On 16 June 1956 (the annual celebration of Bloomsday), just months after their first meeting the two poets married and honeymooned in Benidorm.

A year later Hughes and Plath relocated to Massachusetts so Plath could teach at her alma mater, Smith College. With Plath finding trouble in both working on her poetry and teaching, the couple eventually moved back to London by the end of 1959. On 1 April 1960, Plath gave birth to their first daughter, Frieda Hughes, and on 17 January 1962 she gave birth to their second child and first son Nicholas Hughes. In between the births of Frieda and Nicholas, Plath had gotten pregnant and suffered a miscarriage in 1961. In letters written to her therapist between 18 February 1960 and 4 February 1963, unseen until 2017, Plath accuses Hughes of physically abusing her just days before her miscarriage.

== Contents ==
1. "Fulbright Scholars"
2. "Caryatids (1)"
3. "Caryatids (2)"
4. "Visit"
5. "Sam"
6. "The Tender Place"
7. "St Botolph's"
8. "The Shot"
9. "Trophies"
10. "18 Rugby Street"
11. "The Machine"
12. "God Help the Wolf after Whom the Dogs Do Not Bark"
13. "Fidelity"
14. "Fate Playing"
15. "The Owl"
16. "A Pink Wool Knitted Dress"
17. "Your Paris"
18. "You Hated Spain"
19. "Moonwalk"
20. "Drawing"
21. "Fever"
22. "55 Eltisley"
23. "Chaucer"
24. "Ouija"
25. "The Earthenware Head"
26. "Wuthering Heights"
27. "The Chipmunk"
28. "Horoscope"
29. "Flounders"
30. "The Blue Flannel Suit"
31. "Child's Park"
32. "9 Willow Street"
33. "The Literary Life"
34. "The Bird"
35. "Astringency"
36. "The Badlands"
37. "Fishing Bridge"
38. "The 59th Bear"
39. "Grand Canyon"
40. "Karlsbad Caverns"
41. "Black Coat"
42. "Portraits"
43. "Stubbing Wharfe"
44. "Remission"
45. "Isis"
46. "Epiphany"
47. "The Gypsy"
48. "A Dream"
49. "The Minotaur"
50. "The Pan"
51. "Error"
52. "The Lodger"
53. "Daffodils"
54. "The Afterbirth"
55. "Setebos"
56. "A Short Film"
57. "The Rag Rug"
58. "The Table"
59. "Apprehensions"
60. "Dream Life"
61. "Perfect Light"
62. "The Rabbit Catcher"
63. "Suttee"
64. "The Bee God"
65. "Being Christlike"
66. "The Beach"
67. "Dreamers"
68. "Fairy Tale"
69. "The Blackbird"
70. "Totem"
71. "Robbing Myself"
72. "Blood and Innocence"
73. "Costly Speech"
74. "The Inscription"
75. "Night-Ride on Ariel"
76. "Telos"
77. "Brasilia"
78. "The Cast"
79. "The Ventriloquist"
80. "Life after Death"
81. "The Hands"
82. "The Prism"
83. "The God"
84. "Freedom of Speech"
85. "A Picture of Otto"
86. "Fingers"
87. "The Dogs Are Eating Your Mother"
88. "Red"

== Notable poems ==
There are multiple poems in the collection that address Hughes and Plath's relationship, and many are directly addressed to Plath herself.

=== "Fulbright Scholars" ===
"Fulbright Scholars" is the 1st poem in the book and is told as a memory of Hughes'. In the poem he describes seeing a photo of that year's batch of Fulbright scholars. Many believe that this poem was about Plath, as the two met when she was in England as part of the Fulbright program.

=== "Wuthering Heights" ===
"Wuthering Heights" is the 26th poem in the book and it shares a title with the 1847 novel Wuthering Heights by Emily Brontë. More importantly, Plath has a poem of the same title, released in her 1971 collection Crossing the Water, which Hughes released for Plath posthumously. Some have claimed that Hughes's poem is a direct response to Plath's "Wuthering Heights".

=== "The Blue Flannel Suit" ===
"The Blue Flannel Suit" is the 30th poem in the book and is amongst those most recognized to be about Plath. In the poem, Hughes describes the blue flannel suit Plath was wearing on the first day she began teaching at Smith College in 1957.

== Reception ==
After her death in 1963, Plath's wish to leave behind a meaningful legacy was fulfilled when her Ariel collection of poetry, and her semi-autobiographical novel The Bell Jar, were hailed as masterpieces of modern feminism, causing her to become a feminist icon in the 1970s. Hughes's apparent wish for redemption is realized in this autobiographical collection of poetry. The literary response to the publication of this collection was one of sensation. It was unknown at the time that Hughes was suffering from a terminal disease that may have prompted this unexpected release.

Hughes's Birthday Letters topped the best-seller lists immediately. This was arguably due to public fascination with a persistent mystery surrounding the lives of the two icons. Within a short period of time the collection was awarded the Forward Poetry Prize, the T. S. Eliot Prize for Poetry and the Whitbread Poetry and Whitbread British Book of the Year prizes.

In the New York Times, book critic Michiko Kakutani praised the collection: "the poems seem remarkably free of self-pity, score-settling and spin; rather, they draw a deeply affecting portrait of the couple's marriage." The poems, she wrote, "dazzle not only with verbal dexterity but also with clear-hearted emotion. They are clearly the work of a poet writing out of the deepest core of his being."
