= The Blue Flannel Suit =

"The Blue Flannel Suit" is a poem by Ted Hughes published in 1998 in his book Birthday Letters. The 30th of 88 poems in the collection, "The Blue Flannel Suit" is one of several in the series explicitly about his wife Sylvia Plath. Prior to the series, Hughes had rarely discussed their relationship or Plath's death or responded to claims by some critics that he bore some responsibility for her state of mind and death.

== Context and analysis ==
In the poem, Hughes describes the blue flannel suit Plath wore for her first day of teaching at Smith College in 1957, just prior to her 25th birthday. Plath had graduated from Smith in 1955 and returned there after attending Newnham College, Cambridge on a Fulbright Scholarship. While at Cambridge, she met Hughes, and they were living together when she began teaching. Plath found it difficult to both teach and have enough time and energy to write and in the middle of 1958, the couple moved to Boston. Plath took a job as a receptionist in the psychiatric unit of Massachusetts General Hospital and became involved in the local poetry scene.

In the poem, Hughes describes the suit as a "mad, execution uniform" which represented what Plath wanted to become. In retrospect, Hughes describes how ill-fitted she was for the short-lived job teaching, using her clothing as a symbol. Critic Lynda Buntzen writes that the poem plays with the sense of time to capture the simultaneously fleeting and permanent sense of loss Hughes felt: Lines like "as I am stilled / Permanently now, permanently / Bending so briefly at your open coffin" juxtapose descriptions of a fleeting moment with a sense of permanence.
