= Dynod Bwr =

Dynod son of Pabo (Welsh: Dynod or Dunod ap Pabo; Latin: Dunaunt; died c. 595), better known as Dynod the Stout (Welsh: Dynod Bwr) or Dynod Fawr was the ruler in the post-Roman Hen Ogledd ("Old North"). Regio Dunutinga was a region mentioned in the Life of Wilfrid. It might be somewhere in the Peninnes. Alternatively P.N. Wood identifies Dunoting with the area of Craven.

Dynod was a son of Pabo Post Prydain and is thought to have succeeded to his kingdom. He was the father of Saint Deiniol, founder of Bangor by Dwywai ferch Lleenog.

Dynod is mentioned in the Welsh Triads (TYP no.5) as one of the ‘Three Pillars of Battle’ of Ynys Prydain. He is also mentioned in a poem on the death of Urien of Rheged. Llywarch Hen says: "Let savage Unhwch guide me; It was said in Drws Llech, ‘Dunod ap Pabo does not retreat.’" After the assassination of Urien, Dynod is said to have invaded his kingdom of Rheged, doing battle against Urien's sons Owain and Pascent. He is said to have died at the hands of the Bernician Angles around AD 595.

Dynod is often confused with the abbot Saint Dunod of Bangor Iscoed mentioned by Bede. Archaeologist Craig Cessford suggests that Dynod may be the same individual as the baby Dinogad referred to in the early medieval Welsh lullaby Dinogad's Smock.
