= Old North (Britain) =

Term for medieval Brittonic-speaking northern Britain

A map of the Old North circa 500 AD

The Old North (Welsh: Hen Ogledd, Welsh pronunciation: [ˌheːn ˈɔɡlɛð]) is the term used in modern scholarship for the historical and literary space which was inhabited by Brittonic-speaking peoples of modern Northern England and southern Scotland in the Early Middle Ages. The people of Wales and those of the Old North considered themselves to be one people, and both were referred to as Cymry ('fellow-countrymen') from the Brittonic word combrogi. The Old North was distinct from the parts of Great Britain inhabited by the Picts, Anglo-Saxons, and Scoti.

The major kingdoms of the Old North were Elmet, Gododdin, Rheged, and the Kingdom of Strathclyde (Welsh: Ystrad Clud). Smaller kingdoms included Aeron and Calchfynydd. Eidyn, Lleuddiniawn, and Manaw Gododdin were evidently parts of Gododdin. The later Anglian kingdoms of Deira and Bernicia both had Brittonic-derived names, suggesting they may have been Brittonic kingdoms originally. All the kingdoms of the Old North except Strathclyde were gradually either integrated or subsumed by the emerging Anglo-Saxon kingdoms, Gaelic Scots and fellow Brittonic Picts by about 800; Strathclyde was eventually incorporated into the rising Middle Irish-speaking Kingdom of Scotland in the 11th century.

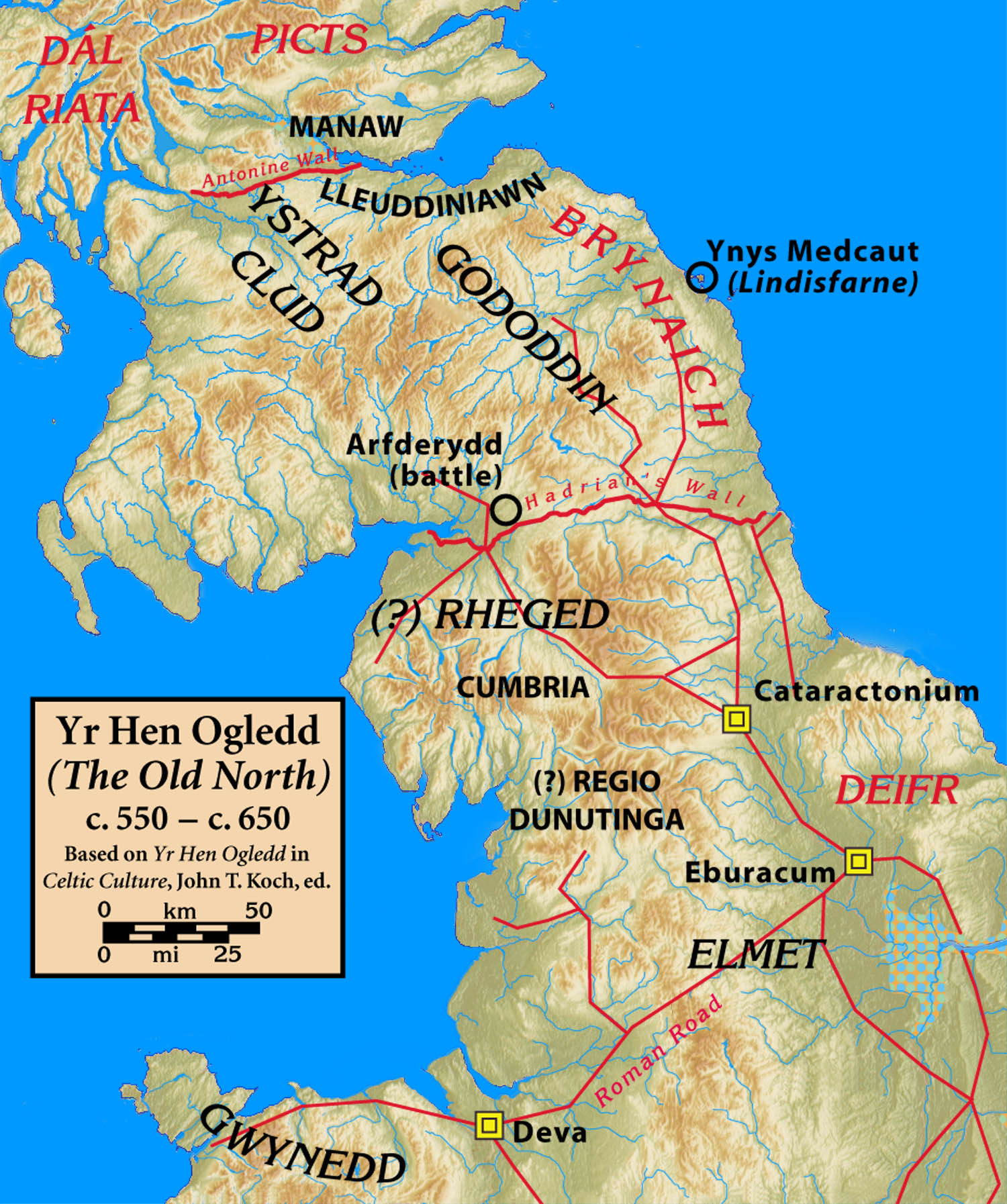
Old North

The memory of the Old North remained strong in Wales after its fall, and indeed the term came into being in Wales after the destruction of the Brittonic kingdoms of the north. Welsh tradition included genealogies of the Gwŷr y Gogledd, or Men of the North, and several important Welsh dynasties traced their lineage to them. A number of important early Welsh texts were attributed to the Men of the North, such as Taliesin, Aneirin, Myrddin Wyllt, and the Cynfeirdd poets. Heroes of the north such as Urien, Owain mab Urien, and Coel Hen and his descendants feature in Welsh poetry and the Welsh Triads.

== Background ==
Almost nothing is reliably known of Central Britain before c. 550. There had never been a period of long-term, effective Roman control north of the Tyne–Solway line, and south of that line effective Roman control began to erode before the traditionally given date of departure of the Roman military from Roman Britain in 407. It was noted in the writings of Ammianus Marcellinus and others that there was ever-decreasing Roman control from about 100 onward, and in the years after 360 there was widespread disorder and the large-scale permanent abandonment of territory by the Romans.

By 550, the region was controlled by native Brittonic-speaking peoples except for the eastern coastal areas, which were controlled by the Anglian peoples of Bernicia and Deira. To the north were the Picts (now also accepted as Brittonic speakers prior to Gaelicisation) with the Gaelic kingdom of Dál Riata to the northwest. All of these peoples would play a role in the history of the Old North.

=== Historical context ===
From a historical perspective, wars were frequently internecine, and Britons were aggressors as well as defenders, as was also true of the Angles, Picts, and Gaels. However, those Welsh stories of the Old North that tell of Britons fighting Anglians have a counterpart, told from the opposite side. The story of the demise of the kingdoms of the Old North is the story of the rise of the Kingdom of Northumbria from two coastal kingdoms to become the premier power in Britain north of the Humber and south of the Firth of Clyde and the Firth of Forth.

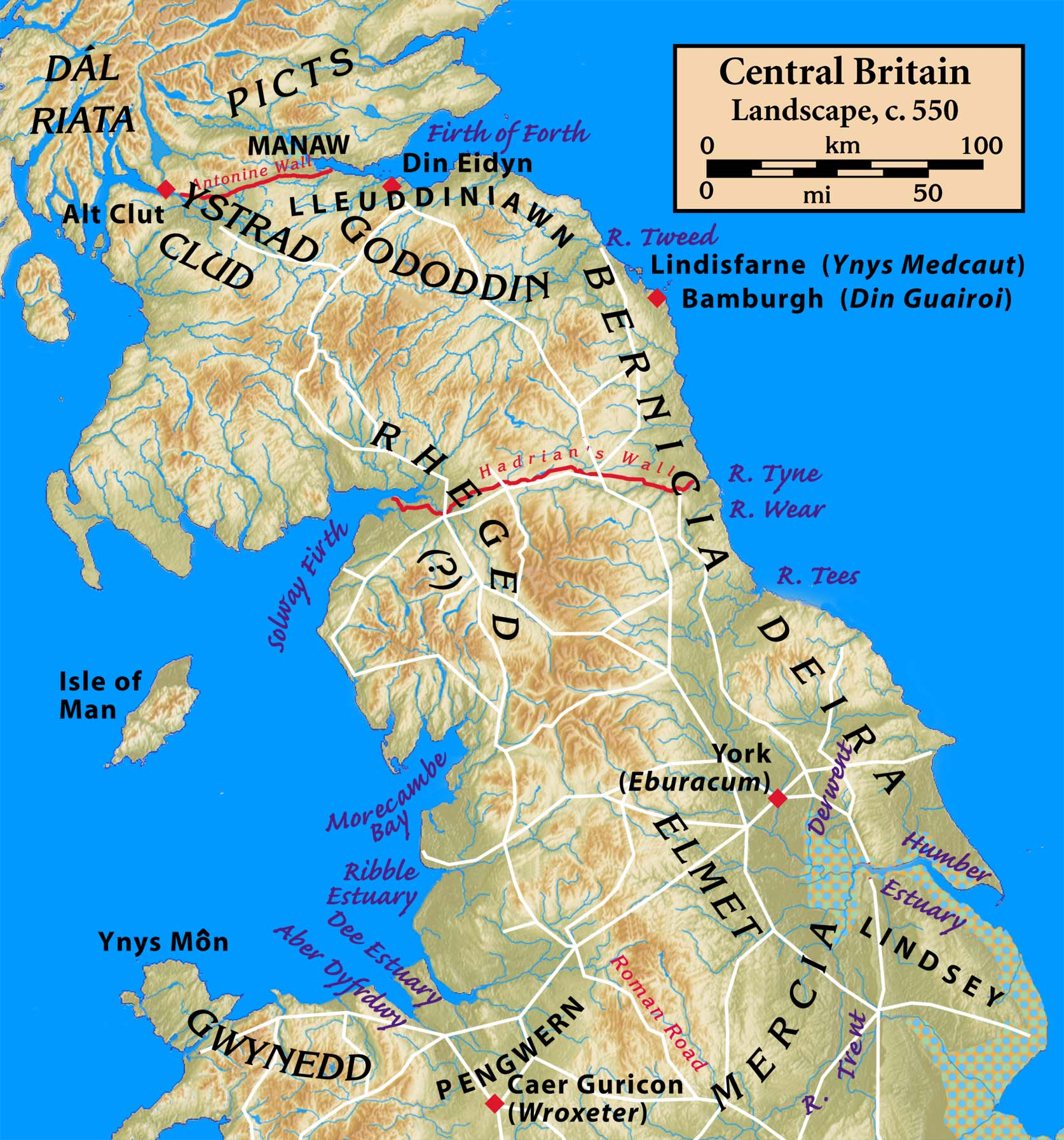

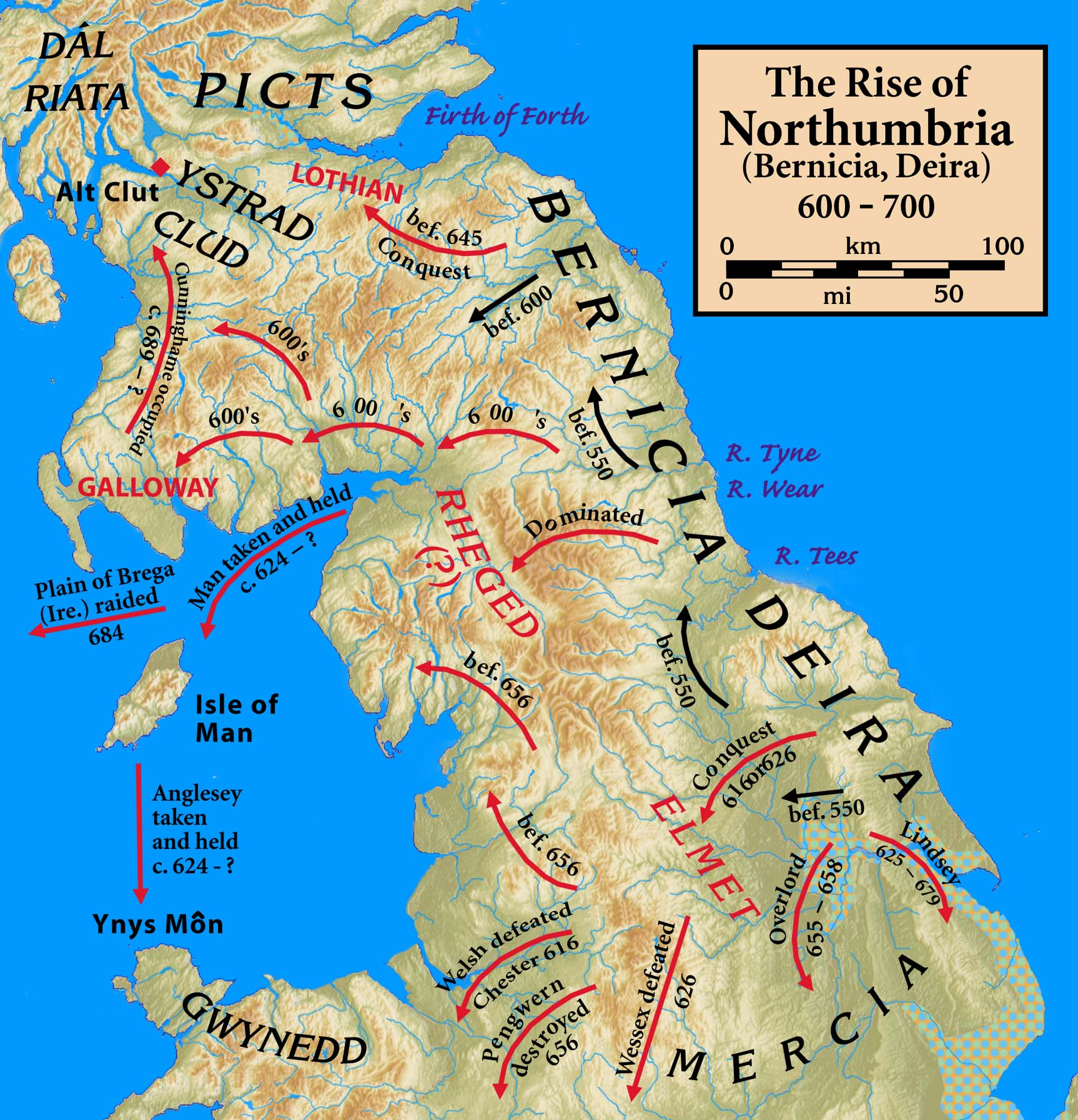

The interests of kingdoms of this era were not restricted to their immediate vicinity. Alliances were not made only within the same ethnic groups, nor were enmities restricted to nearby different ethnic groups. An alliance of Britons fought against another alliance of Britons at the Battle of Arfderydd. Áedán mac Gabráin of Dál Riata appears in the Bonedd Gwŷr y Gogledd, a genealogy among the pedigrees of the Men of the North. The Historia Brittonum states that Oswiu, king of Northumbria, married a Briton who may have had some Pictish ancestry. A marriage between the Northumbrian and Pictish royal families would produce the Pictish king Talorgan I. Áedán mac Gabráin fought as an ally of the Britons against the Northumbrians. Cadwallon ap Cadfan of the Kingdom of Gwynedd allied with Penda of Mercia to defeat Edwin of Northumbria.

Conquest and defeat did not necessarily mean the extirpation of one culture and its replacement by another. The Brittonic region of northwestern England was absorbed by Anglian Northumbria in the 7th century, yet it would reemerge 300 years later as South Cumbria, joined with North Cumbria (Strathclyde) into a single state.

=== Social organisation ===
The organisation of the Men of the North was tribal, (Note: The tribal domains were called kingdoms and were led by a king, but were not organised nation-states in the modern (or ancient Roman) sense of the word. The kingdoms might grow and shrink based on the transitory fortunes of the leading tribe and royal family, with regional alliances and enmities playing a part in the resulting organisation. This organisation was applicable to southern Wales of the post-Roman era, where the royal inter-relationships of the kingdoms of Glywysing, Gwent, and Ergyng are so completely inter-twined that it is not possible to construct an independent history for any of them. When contention (i.e., war) occurred, it was between high-ranking individuals and their respective clients, in the manner of the contending House of Lancaster and House of York during the Wars of the Roses in the 15th century.) based on kinship groups of extended families, owing allegiance to a dominant "royal" family, sometimes indirectly through client relationships, and receiving protection in return. For Celtic peoples, this organisation was still in effect hundreds of years later, as shown in the Irish Brehon law, the Welsh Laws of Hywel Dda, and the Scottish Laws of the Brets and Scots. The Anglo-Saxon law had culturally different origins, but with many similarities to Celtic law. Like Celtic law, it was based on cultural tradition, without any perceivable debt to the Roman occupation of Britain. (Note: "Anglo-Saxon law" is a modern neologism for the Saxon Law of Wessex, the Anglian Law of Mercia, and the Danelaw, all of which were sufficiently similar to merit inclusion within this umbrella term. The laws of Anglian Northumbria were supplanted by the Danelaw, but were certainly similar to these. The origins of English law have been much studied. For example, the 12th century Tractatus de legibus et consuetudinibus regni Angliae (Treatise on the laws and customs of the Kingdom of England) is the book of authority on English common law, and scholars have held that it owes a debt to Norman law and to Germanic law, and not to Roman law.)

A primary royal court (Welsh: llys) would be maintained as a "capital", but it was not the bureaucratic administrative centre of modern society, nor the settlement or civitas of Roman rule. As the ruler and protector of his kingdom, the king would maintain multiple courts throughout his territory, travelling among them to exercise his authority and to address the needs of his people, such as in the dispensing of justice. This ancient method of dispensing justice survived as a part of royal procedure until the reforms of Henry II (reigned 1154–1189) modernised the administration of law.

== Language ==
Modern scholarship uses the term "Cumbric" for the Brittonic language spoken in the Old North. It appears to have been very closely related to Old Welsh, with some local variances, and more distantly related to Cornish or Breton. There are no surviving texts written in the language; evidence for it comes from placenames, proper names in a few early inscriptions and later non-Cumbric sources, two terms in the Leges inter Brettos et Scottos, and the corpus of poetry by the cynfeirdd, the "early poets", nearly all of which deals with the north.

The cynfeirdd poetry is the largest source of information, and it is generally accepted that some part of the corpus was first composed in the Old North. However, it survives entirely in later manuscripts created in Wales where the oral tradition continued on, and it is unknown how faithful they are to the originals. Still, the texts do contain discernible variances that distinguish the speech from the Welsh dialects. In particular, these texts contain a number of archaisms – features that appear to have once been common in all Brittonic varieties, but which later vanished from Welsh and the Southwestern Brittonic languages. In general, however, the differences appear to be slight, and the distinction between Cumbric and Old Welsh is largely geographical rather than linguistic.

Cumbric gradually disappeared as the area was conquered by the Anglo-Saxons, and later the Scots and Norse, though it survived in the Kingdom of Strathclyde, centred at Alt Clut in what is now Dumbarton in Scotland. Kenneth H. Jackson suggested that it re-emerged in Cumbria in the 10th century, as Strathclyde established hegemony over that area. It is unknown when Cumbric finally became extinct, but the series of counting systems of Brittonic origin recorded in Northern England since the 18th century have been proposed as evidence of a survival of elements of Cumbric; though the view has been largely rejected on linguistic grounds, with evidence pointing to the fact that it was imported to England after the Old English era.

== Welsh tradition ==
One of the traditional stories relating to the genealogies of Welsh dynasties derived from Cunedda and his sons as "Men of the North". Cunedda himself is held to be the progenitor of the royal dynasty of the Kingdom of Gwynedd, one of the largest and most powerful of the medieval Welsh kingdoms, and an ongoing connection to the Old North. Cunedda's genealogy shows him as a descendant of one of Magnus Maximus' generals, Paternus, who Maximus appointed as commander at Alt Clut. The Welsh and the Men of the North may have seen themselves as one people. The Welsh name for themselves, Cymry, derives from this ancient relationship, although this is debatable, as while Gwynedd seemed to have good relationships with them, and with Ceredigion, it is unknown how the other Welsh Kingdoms saw them, since they were not unified themselves, especially the southern Kingdoms like Dyfed and Ystrad Tywi, which had heavy Irish presence at the time. 'Cymry' was a term that referred to both the Welsh and the Men of the North but was sometimes applied to others such as the Picts and the Irish as well. It is derived from the Brittonic word combrogoi, which meant "fellow-countrymen", and it is worth noting in passing that its Breton counterpart kenvroiz still has this original meaning of "compatriots". The word began to be used as an endonym by the Men of the North during the early 7th century (and possibly earlier), and was used throughout the Middle Ages to describe the Kingdom of Strathclyde. Before this, and for some centuries after, the traditional as well as the more literary term was Brythoniaid, recalling the still older time when all on the island remained a unity. Cymry survives today in the native name for Wales (Cymru, land of the Cymry), and in the English county name Cumbria, both meaning "homeland", "mother country".

Many of the traditional sources of information about the Old North survive in Welsh tradition, and bards such as Aneirin (the reputed author of Y Gododdin) are thought to have been court poets in the Old North.

== Nature of the sources ==
A listing of passages from the literary and historical sources, particularly relevant to the Old North, can be found in Sir Edward Anwyl's article Wales and the Britons of the North. A somewhat dated introduction to the study of old Welsh poetry can be found in his 1904 article Prolegomena to the Study of Old Welsh Poetry.

=== Literary sources ===
- The bardic poetry attributed to Taliesin, Aneirin, and Llywarch Hen.
- The genealogical tracts of the Harleian genealogies, the Bonedd Gwŷr y Gogledd, and the genealogies of Jesus College MS 20.
- The Triads of the Island of Britain (note that most of the triads published in the notorious third volume of The Myvyrian Archaiology of Wales are known to be the forgeries of Iolo Morganwg, and are not considered valid sources of historical information). The standard scholarly edition is Trioedd Ynys Prydein by Rachel Bromwich.
- The other elegies (Welsh: marwnadau) and songs of praise (Welsh: canu mawl), as well as certain mythological stories, that have been preserved.

Stories praising a patron and the construction of flattering genealogies are neither unbiased nor reliable sources of historically accurate information. However, while they may exaggerate and make apocryphal assertions, they do not falsify or change the historical facts that were known to the bards' listeners, as that would bring ridicule and disrepute to both the bards and their patrons. In addition, the existence of stories of defeat and tragedy, as well as stories of victory, lends additional credibility to their value as sources of history. Within that context, the stories contain useful information, much of it incidental, about an era of British history where very little is reliably known.

=== Historical sources ===
- The Historia Brittonum attributed to Nennius
- The Annales Cambriae
- The Anglo-Saxon Chronicle
- The Ecclesiastical History of the English People by Bede
- The Annals of Tigernach

These sources are not without deficiencies. Both the authors and their later transcribers sometimes displayed a partisanship that promoted their own interests, portraying their own agendas in a positive light, always on the side of justice and moral rectitude. Facts in opposition to those agendas are sometimes omitted, and apocryphal entries are sometimes added.

While Bede was a Northumbrian partisan and spoke with prejudice against the native Britons, his Ecclesiastical History of the English People is highly regarded for its effort towards an accurate telling of history, and for its use of reliable sources. When passing along "traditional" information that lacks a historical foundation, Bede takes care to note it as such.

The De Excidio et Conquestu Britanniae by Gildas (c. 516–570) is occasionally relevant in that it mentions early people and places also mentioned in the literary and historical sources. This work is primarily a Christian moral exhortation directed at the secular and ecclesiastical rulers of Gildas's time rather than a conventional history. It is also an important contemporary source for the arrival of the Saxons in Britain.

=== Place names ===
Brittonic place names in Scotland south of the Forth and Clyde, and in Cumberland and neighbouring counties, indicate areas of Old North inhabited by Britons in the early Middle Ages.

Isolated locations of later British presence are also indicated by place names of Old English and Old Norse origin. In Yorkshire, the names of Walden, Walton and Walburn, from Old English walas "Britons or Welshmen", indicate Britons encountered by the Anglo-Saxons, and the name of Birkby, from Old Norse Breta "Britons", indicates a place where the Vikings met Britons.

=== Dubious and fraudulent sources ===
The Historia Regum Britanniae of Geoffrey of Monmouth is disparaged as pseudohistory, though it looms large as a source for the largely fictional chivalric romance stories known collectively as the Matter of Britain. The lack of historical value attributed to the Historia lies only partly in the fact that it contains so many fictions and falsifications of history; (Note: Scholarly works by reputable authors, such as Lloyd's 1911 A History of Wales from the Earliest Times to the Edwardian Conquest, contain numerous citations of Geoffrey's fabrications of history, never citing him as a source of legitimate historical information. More recent works of history tend to spend less energy on Geoffrey's Historia, merely ignoring him in passing. In Davies's 1990 A History of Wales, the first paragraph of page 1 discusses Geoffrey's prominence, after which he is occasionally mentioned as the source of historical inaccuracies and not as a source of legitimate historical information. Earlier works might devote a few paragraphs detailing the proof that Geoffrey was the inventor of fictitious information, such as in James Parker's The Early History of Oxford, where persons such as Eldad, Eldod, Abbot Ambrius, and others are noted to be the result of Geoffrey's own imagination.) the fact that historical accuracy clearly was not a consideration in its creation makes any references to actual people and places no more than a literary convenience.

The Iolo Manuscripts are a collection of manuscripts presented in the early 19th century by Edward Williams, who is better known as Iolo Morganwg. Containing various tales, anecdotal material and elaborate genealogies that connect virtually everyone of note with everyone else of note (and with many connections to Arthur and Iolo's native region of Morgannwg), they were at first accepted as genuine, but have since been shown to be an assortment of forged or doctored manuscripts, transcriptions, and fantasies, mainly invented by Iolo himself. A list of works tainted by their reliance on the material presented by Iolo (sometimes without attribution) would be quite long.

== Kingdoms and regions ==
=== Major kingdoms ===
Places in the Old North that are mentioned as kingdoms in the literary and historical sources include:

- Alt Clut or Ystrad Clud – a kingdom centred at what is now Dumbarton in Scotland. Later known as Strathclyde, and possibly even later as Cumbria, it was one of the best attested of the northern British kingdoms. It was also the last surviving, as it operated as an independent realm into the 11th century before it was finally absorbed by the Kingdom of Scotland.
- Elmet – centred in western Yorkshire in northern England. It was located south of the other northern British kingdoms, and well east of present-day Wales, but managed to survive into the early 7th century.
- Gododdin – a kingdom in what is now southeastern Scotland and northeastern England, the area previously noted as the territory of the Votadini. They are the subjects of the poem Y Gododdin, which memorialises a disastrous raid by an army raised by the Gododdin on the Angles of Bernicia.
- Rheged – a major kingdom that evidently included parts of present-day Cumbria, though its full extent is unknown. It may have covered a vast area at one point, as it is very closely associated with its king Urien, whose name is tied to places all over northwestern Britain.

=== Minor kingdoms and other regions ===
Several regions are mentioned in the sources, assumed to be notable regions within one of the kingdoms if not separate kingdoms themselves:

- Aeron – a minor kingdom mentioned in sources such as Y Gododdin, its location is uncertain, but several scholars have suggested that it was in the Ayrshire region of southwest Scotland. It is frequently associated with Urien Rheged, and may have been part of his realm.
- Calchfynydd ("Chalkmountain") – almost nothing is known about this area, though it was likely somewhere in the Old North, as an evident ruler, Cadrawd Calchfynydd, is listed in the Bonedd Gwŷr y Gogledd. William Forbes Skene suggested an identification with Kelso (formerly Calchow) in the Scottish Borders.
- Eidyn – this was the area around the modern city of Edinburgh, then known as Din Eidyn (Fort of Eidyn). It was closely associated with the Gododdin kingdom. Kenneth H. Jackson argued strongly that Eidyn referred exclusively to Edinburgh, but other scholars have taken it as a designation for the wider area. The name may survive today in toponyms such as Edinburgh (Dùn Èideann in Gaelic, Din Eidyn in Cumbric, and Carriden (from Caer Eidyn)), located fifteen miles to the west. Din Eidyn was besieged by the Angles in 638 and was under their control for most of the next three centuries.
- Manaw Gododdin – the coastal area south of the Firth of Forth, and part of the territory of the Gododdin. The name survives in Slamannan Moor and the village of Slamannan, in Stirlingshire. This is derived from Sliabh Manann, the 'Moor of Manann'. It also appears in the name of Dalmeny, some 5 miles northwest of Edinburgh, and formerly known as Dumanyn, assumed to be derived from Dun Manann. The name also survives north of the Forth in Pictish Manaw as the name of the burgh of Clackmannan and the eponymous county of Clackmannanshire, derived from Clach Manann, the 'stone of Manann', referring to a monument stone located there.
- Novant – a kingdom mentioned in Y Gododdin, presumably related to the Iron Age Novantae tribe of southwestern Scotland.
- Regio Dunutinga – a minor kingdom or region in North Yorkshire mentioned in the Life of Wilfrid. It was evidently named for a ruler named Dunaut, perhaps the Dunaut ap Pabo known from the genealogies. Its name may survive in the modern town of Dent, Cumbria.

Kingdoms that were not part of the Old North but are part of its history include:

- Dál Riata – Though this was a Gaelic kingdom, the family of Áedán mac Gabráin of Dál Riata appears in the Bonedd Gwŷr y Gogledd
- The Anglo-Saxon kingdom of Northumbria and its predecessor states, Bernicia and Deira
- Pictish kingdom

=== Possible kingdoms ===
The following names appear in historical and literary sources, but it is unknown whether or not they refer to British kingdoms and regions of the Old North.

- Bryneich – this is the British name for the Anglo-Saxon kingdom of Bernicia. There was probably a British kingdom in this area before the Anglian kingdom, it this is uncertain.
- Deifr or Dewr – this was the British name for Anglo-Saxon Deira, a region between the River Tees and the Humber. The name is of British origin, as with Bryneich, it is unknown if it represented an earlier British kingdom.

== See also ==
- Wales in the Early Middle Ages
- Scotland in the Early Middle Ages
- History of Anglo-Saxon England
- England in the Middle Ages
- Northumbria
- Mercia
- Kingdom of Gwynedd
- Historical basis for King Arthur
- Cumbric language
- King Cole
