= Elvet Hundred =

Historic hundred in Carmarthenshire, Wales

Coordinates: 51.899°N 4.332°W

Elvet was a hundred, a geographic division, in the northwest of the traditional county of Carmarthenshire, Wales.

The divisions of the Elvet Hundred were: Aber-Nant, Abergwili, Cenarth, Cilrhedyn, Conwil Elfed, Llangeler, Llanllawddog, Llanpumsaint, Merthyr, Newchurch, Pen-Boyr, Tre-Lech a'r Betws.
