= Kingdom of Elmet =

Early Middle Ages kingdom of northern England

Coordinates: 53.86°N 1.15°W

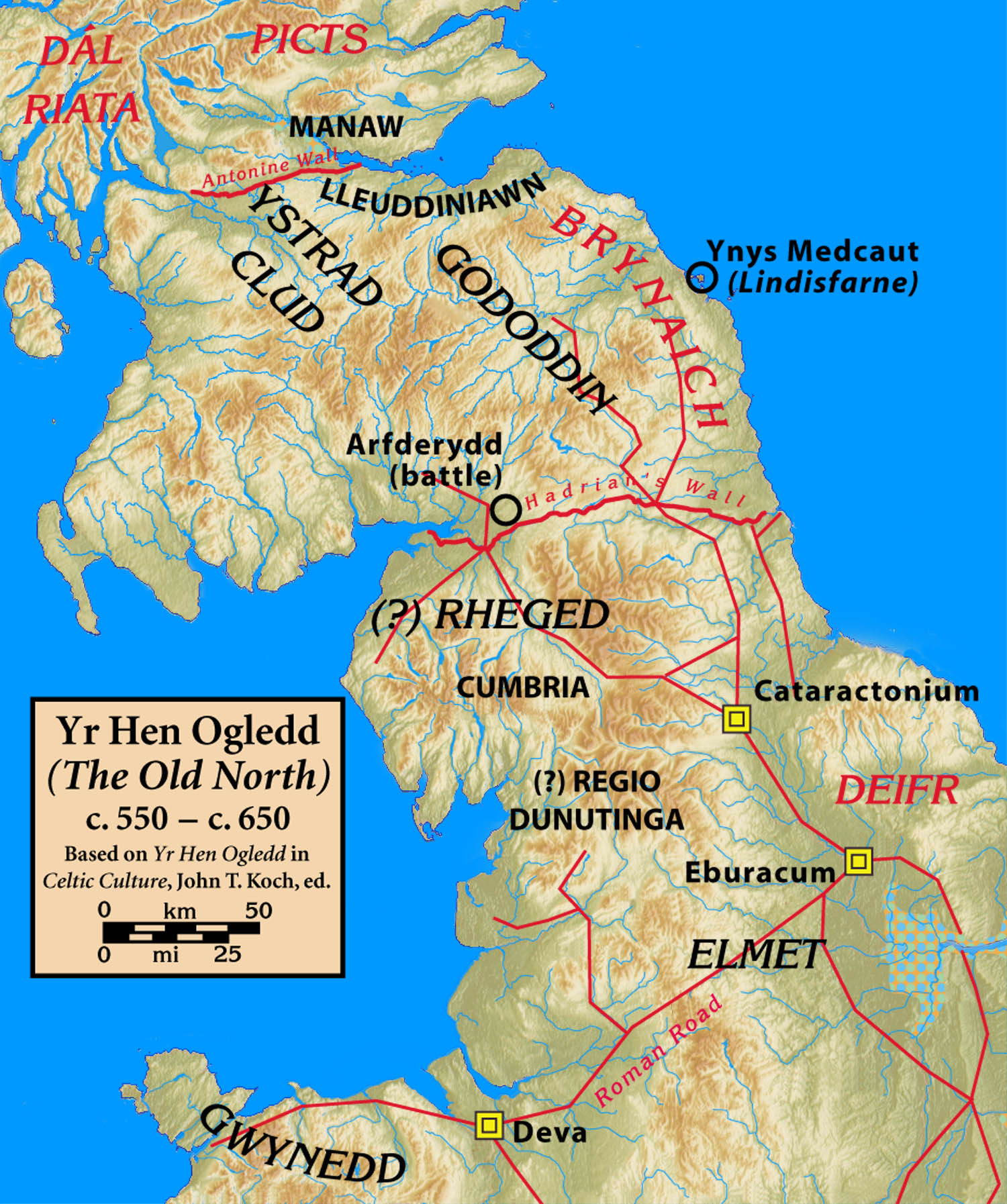
- The Old North c. 550 – c. 650
- Government: Monarchy
  - fl. 580: Gwallog ap Llênog?
  - fl. before 616: Ceretic of Elmet
- Historical era: Early Middle Ages
Succeeded by
Kingdom of Northumbria

Elmet, sometimes known as Elfed or Elmete, was a Brythonic kingdom thought to have been an independent polity between the 5th century and sometime after the mid-7th century as part of the Old North.

The people of Elmet survived as a distinctly recognised group for centuries after it was absorbed into Yorkshire in what later became the smaller area of the West Riding of Yorkshire, and now West Yorkshire, South Yorkshire and north Derbyshire.

== Geography ==
The northern and western borders of the kingdom remain unclear, but it adjoined the kingdoms of Deira to its north and Mercia to its south, while its western boundary appears to have been another British kingdom, Craven. As such, it was not conterminous with other territories of the Britons at the time, being well to the south of others in the Old North, such as Strathclyde, and north-east of Wales, Cornwall and Dumnonia. As one of the south-easternmost Brittonic regions for which there is reasonably substantial evidence, Elmet is notable for having survived relatively late in the period of Anglo-Saxon settlement of Britain.

The term is used as an affix to place names between Leeds and Selby, including Barwick in Elmet and Sherburn in Elmet. It was thus used more widely in medieval times, for places in the wapentakes of Barkston Ash and Skyrack, including Burton Salmon, Sutton (east of Castleford), Micklefield, Kirkby Wharfe, Saxton, and Clifford. In the tribal hidage, the extent of Elmet is described as 600 hides; while a hide was a unit of value rather than area, 600 hides would probably have encompassed an area slightly larger than the combined total of the wapentakes of Barkston Ash and Skyrack. Hence scholars such as A. H. Smith concluded that those two wapentakes probably approximated to much of the area of the former Elmet.

== History ==
Elmet is attested mainly in toponymic and archaeological evidence; a reference to one Madog Elfed in the medieval Welsh poem The Gododdin and to a Gwallog also operating somewhere in the region in one of the putatively early poems in the Book of Taliesin; and historical sources such as the Historia Brittonum and Bede. The Historia Brittonum is the only source that states directly that Elmet was a kingdom. While Bede does not specifically describe Elmet as a kingdom, but rather as silva Elmete the "forest of Elmet", it is clear from his discussion that it was a distinct polity, with its own monarchs. The name is Brythonic in origin and is also found in Elfed, the name of a cantref in Dyfed, Wales. Andrew Breeze relates the name to the roots el ("many") and medi ("to cut; harvest") with the sense of "those who cut down many (in combat)".

From this evidence it appears that Elmet was one of a number of Sub-Roman Brittonic realms in the Old North – what is now northern England and southern Scotland – during the Early Middle Ages. Other kingdoms included Rheged, the Kingdom of Strathclyde (Ystrad Clud), Bryneich and Gododdin. It is unclear how Elmet came to be established, though it has been suggested that it may have been created from a larger kingdom ruled by the semi-legendary Coel Hen. The historian Alex Woolf suggests that the region of Elmet had a distinct tribal identity in pre-Roman times and that this re-emerged after Roman rule collapsed.

Towards the end of the 6th century, Elmet came under increasing pressure from the expanding Anglo-Saxon kingdoms of Deira and Mercia. Forces from Elmet joined the alliance in 590 against the Angles of Bernicia who had been making massive inroads further to the north. During this war it is thought Elmet's king Gwallog was killed. The northern alliance collapsed after Urien of Rheged was murdered and a feud broke out between two of its key members.

After the unification of the Anglian Kingdom of Northumbria, King Edwin of Northumbria led an invasion of Elmet, and overran it in 616 or 617. Bede's Ecclesiastical History of the English People says that a Northumbrian noble, Hereric (father of Hilda of Whitby), an exiled member of the Northumbrian royal house, was killed with poison while living at the court of King Ceretic of Elmet. It has been suggested that this was either the casus belli for the invasion, if Hereric was poisoned by his hosts, or a pretext for a Northumbrian annexation of Elmet, if Edwin himself had Hereric poisoned. The Historia Brittonum says that Edwin "occupied Elmet and expelled Certic [sic], king of that country". It is generally presumed that Ceretic was the same person known in Welsh sources as Ceredig ap Gwallog, king of Elmet. A number of ancestors of Ceretic are recorded in Welsh sources: one of Taliesin's poems is for his father, Gwallog ap Llênog, who may have ruled Elmet near the end of the 6th century. Bede mentions that "subsequent kings made a house for themselves in the district, which is called Loidis".

However some sources do indicate that Elmet was actually peacefully annexed by Northumbria and that there was no direct military confrontation.

After the annexation of Elmet, the realm was incorporated into Northumbria on Easter in 627. Its people were known subsequently as the Elmetsæte. They are recorded in the late 7th century Tribal Hidage as the inhabitants of a minor territory of 600 hides. They were the most northerly group recorded in the Tribal Hidage. Probably continuing as a distinct Brittonic group throughout most of the Anglo-Saxon period, they may have colluded with Cadwallon ap Cadfan of Gwynedd when he invaded Northumbria and briefly held the area in 633.

A major battle between Northumbria and Mercia, the Battle of the Winwaed took place in the area in 655, according to Bede, somewhere in the region of Loidis.

The Life of Cathróe of Metz mentions Loidam Civitatem as the boundary between the Norsemen of Scandinavian York and the Celtic Britons of the Kingdom of Ystrad Clud (Strathclyde). If this refers to Leeds, it might suggest that the Kingdom of Elmet may have either regained independence soon after Northumbria's original annexation of it (Bede makes note of the fracturing of Northumbria after Edwin's death) or later up to the time.

Interestingly; as late as 1315, a Florentine bill of sale (wool) records:

- d'Elmetta 11 marks per sack
- Di Ledesia (Leeds) 12½ marks per sack
- di Tresche (Thirsk) 10½ marks per sack
- de Vervicche (York) 10½ marks per sack.

The distinction between Leeds and Elmet in the bill is unexplained.

According to a genetic study published in Nature (19 March 2015), the local population of the former West Riding of Yorkshire is genetically distinct from the rest of the population of Yorkshire. The 2015 Oxford University study compared the current genetic distribution in Britain to the geographical maps of its historic kingdoms, and found that the distinct genetic cluster closely corresponds to Elmet’s known territories.

== Aliotus Stone ==
Around 1865, a pillar stone with a 5th- or early 6th-century inscription was found at St Aelhaearn's Church, Llanaelhaearn in Gwynedd. The Latin inscription reads "ALIOTVS ELMETIACOS/HIC IACET", or "Aliotus of Elfed lies here". It is believed that this refers to an otherwise unattested Aliotus from the Kingdom of Elmet who may have been active in the area before Saint Aelhaiarn founded his church.

== Legacy ==
The name survives throughout the area in place names such as Barwick-in-Elmet and Sherburn in Elmet. A local parliamentary constituency was also called Elmet and Rothwell.

The area to the western Calder Valley side of Elmet is the subject of a 1979 book combining photography and poetry, the Remains of Elmet by Ted Hughes and Fay Godwin. The book was republished by Faber and Faber in 1994 as Elmet, with a third of the book being new poems and photographs.

A novel by Fiona Mozley called Elmet was shortlisted for the 2017 Booker Prize.
