= Remains of Elmet =

- First edition
- Author: Ted Hughes
- Genre: Poetry
- Publisher: HarperCollins
- Publication date: June 1979
- Publication place: United Kingdom
- ISBN: 978-0060119539

Remains of Elmet is a collection of poems by Ted Hughes published in 1979. In this book Hughes has poetically covered the region of Elmet. The book contains black and white photographs by Fay Godwin, taken in the barren hill country of West Yorkshire, Hughes's birthplace.

The book was re-published by Faber and Faber in 1994, re-titled as Elmet, with a third of the book comprising additional new poems and photographs.
