= Deiniol =

Welsh saint, first bishop of Bangor

Saint Deiniol
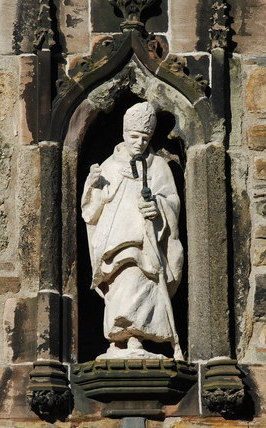
- Statue of Deiniol at Bangor Cathedral

Abbot, Bishop
- Died: 572; Bardsey Island
- Venerated in: Catholic Church; Eastern Orthodox Church; Anglican Communion
- Major shrine: Bangor Cathedral, Bardsey Island
- Feast: 11 September
- Controversy: early life

Saint Deiniol (died 572) was traditionally the first Bishop of Bangor in the Kingdom of Gwynedd, Wales. The present Bangor Cathedral, dedicated to Deiniol, is said to be on the site where his monastery stood. He is venerated in Brittany as Saint Denoual. In English and Latin his name is sometimes rendered as Daniel.

== Life ==
According to a Latin Life of Deiniol, preserved in Peniarth MS226 and transcribed in 1602 by Sir Thomas Williams of Trefriw, he was the son of Abbot Dunod Fawr, son of Pabo Post Prydain. The family, having lost their land in the North of England, were given land by the king of Powys, Cyngen Glodrydd.

Deiniol embraced the religious life and is said to have studied under Cadoc of Llancarfan. Sir David Trevor describes Deiniol as one of the seven blessed cousins who had spent part of his early life as a hermit "on the arm of Pembrokeshire" but was called to be a bishop despite deficiencies in his formal education. Deiniol soon left Powys for Gwynedd where he founded the monastery of Bangor, Gwynedd under the patronage of Maelgwn Gwynedd who endowed it with lands and privileges, later raising it to the rank of the official seat of a bishop, sharing a common boundary with the principality of Gwynedd. Deiniol is said to have been consecrated to that See by St. Dubricius in the year 516. Deiniol spent the remainder of his days there as Abbot and Bishop.

He attended the Synod of Llanddewi Brefi in c. 545 with Saint David when the subject of rules for penance was being discussed. According to the Annales Cambriae Deiniol died in 584 and was buried on Bardsey Island. It is possible that this date, like the dates given for the deaths of David and Kentigern, is twelve years later than it should be, in which case the correct date is 572. The Cathedral Church of Saint Deiniol in Bangor is dedicated in his name.

== Legacy ==
His cult in North Wales was quite extensive and several churches are dedicated to him, including Worthenbury near Wrexham and Hawarden, Flintshire in the north of Wales (as well as other churches in Flintshire). There are also dedicated churches at Llangarron, Llanfor, Llanuwchllyn, Eyton, and Itton; near Cardigan Bay there is a village of Llanddeiniol - "parish of St Deiniol" - which was once the name of Itton.

The church of Marchwiel is dedicated to Deiniol and there are also dedications at Itton in Monmouthshire and Llangarron in Herefordshire.

William Ewart Gladstone dedicated St Deiniol's Library, a residential library in Hawarden, Flintshire, for arts students, in 1896.

In the current Roman Catholic liturgical calendar for Wales and that of the Anglican Church in Wales, he is commemorated on the traditional date of 11 September.

His name has been given to the Deiniol Centre, a shopping centre in Bangor.

He may be referenced in the name of the hymn tune, St. Denio ("Immortal, invisible").

== Sources ==
- S. Baring-Gould and John Fisher. (1908). The Lives of British Saints
- C.J. Clark. The Saints of Wales and Cornwall and such Irish Saints as have dedications in Britain
