= Wales in the Early Middle Ages =

Aspect of Welsh history (383–1066)

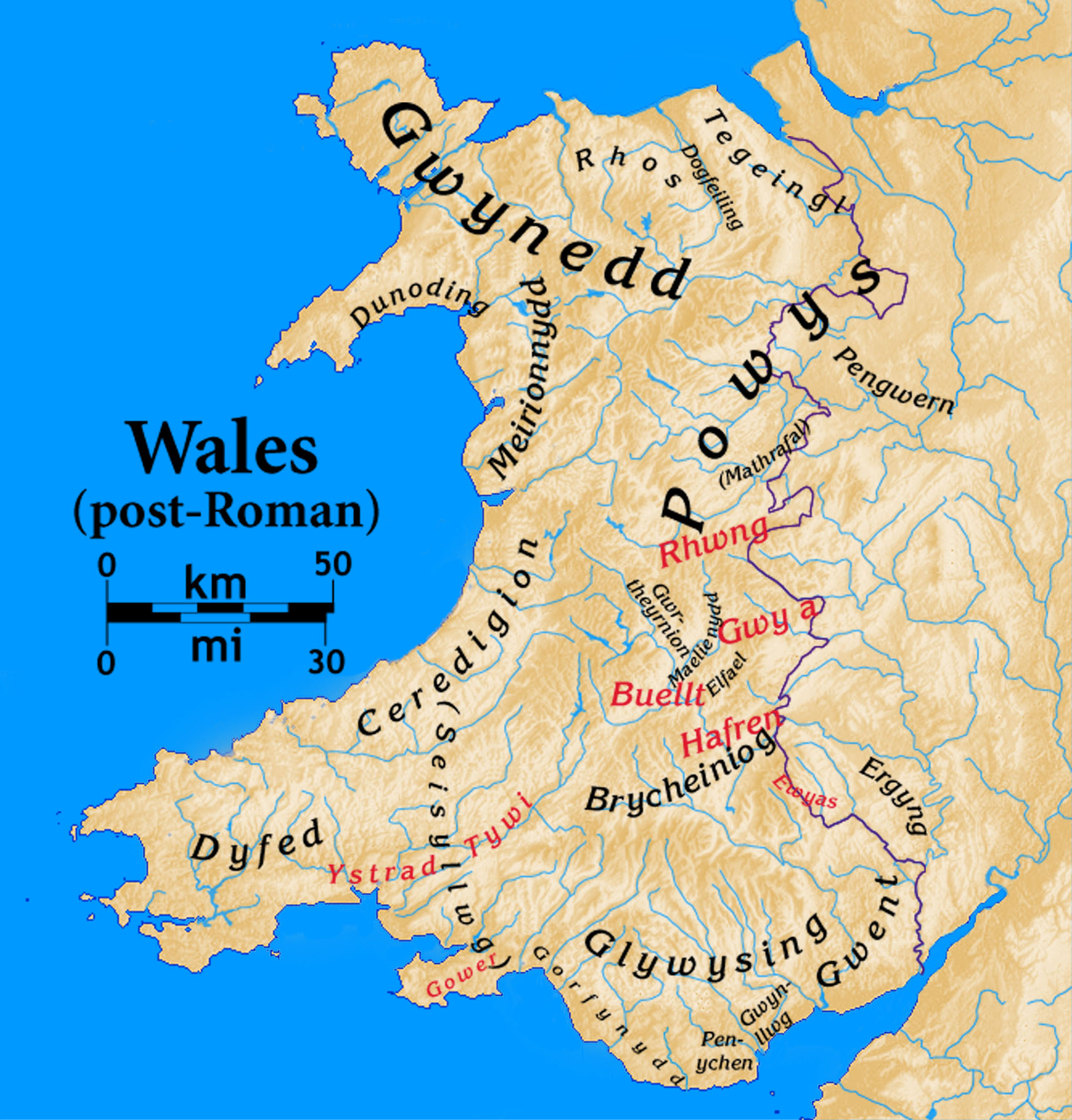
Post-Roman Welsh kingdoms.

Wales in the early Middle Ages covers the time between the Roman departure from Wales c. 383 until the middle of the 11th century. In that time there was a gradual consolidation of power into increasingly hierarchical kingdoms. The end of the early Middle Ages was the time that the Welsh language transitioned from the Primitive Welsh spoken throughout the era into Old Welsh, and the time when the modern England–Wales border would take its near-final form, a line broadly followed by Offa's Dyke, a late eighth-century earthwork. Successful unification into something recognisable as a Welsh state would come in the next era under the descendants of Merfyn Frych.

Wales was rural throughout the era, characterised by small settlements called trefi. The local landscape was controlled by a local aristocracy and ruled by a warrior aristocrat. Control was exerted over a piece of land and, by extension, over the people who lived on that land. Many of the people were tenant peasants or slaves, answerable to the aristocrat who controlled the land on which they lived. There was no sense of a coherent tribe of people and everyone, from ruler down to slave, was defined in terms of their kindred family (the tud) and individual status (braint). Christianity had been introduced in the Roman era, and the Celtic Britons living in and near Wales were Christian throughout the era.

The semi-legendary founding of Gwynedd in the fifth century was followed by internecine warfare in Wales and with the kindred Brittonic kingdoms of northern England and southern Scotland (the Hen Ogledd) and structural and linguistic divergence from the southwestern peninsula British kingdom of Dumnonia known to the Welsh as Cernyw prior to its eventual absorption into Wessex. The seventh and eighth centuries were characterised by ongoing warfare by the northern and eastern Welsh kingdoms against the intruding Anglo-Saxon kingdoms of Northumbria and Mercia. That era of struggle saw the Welsh adopt their modern name for themselves, Cymry, meaning "fellow countrymen", and it also saw the demise of all but one of the kindred kingdoms of northern England and southern Scotland at the hands of then-ascendant Northumbria.

== History ==
Wales as a nation was defined in opposition to later English settlement and incursions into the island of Great Britain. In the early middle ages, the people of Wales continued to think of themselves as Britons, the people of the whole island, but over the course of time one group of these Britons became isolated by the geography of the western peninsula, bounded by the sea and English neighbours. It was these English neighbours who named the land Wallia, and the people Welsh. The people of Wallia, medieval Wales, remained divided into separate kingdoms that fought with each other as much as they fought their English neighbours. Neither were the communities homogenously Welsh. Place name and archeological evidence point to Viking/Norse settlement in places such as Swansea, Fishguard and Anglesey, and Saxons settled amongst the Welsh in places such as Presteigne. It was the Norman invasion of England in 1066, which led soon after to incursions into Wales that overcame these rivalries, encouraging Welsh rulers to attempt to develop Wales into a unified state that could oppose this new threat. It was only in the final stages of conquest that Wales finally achieved this unity. It was the threat of invasion and conquest that created the nation of Wales.

After the Roman withdrawal, Wales remained a rural landscape, controlled by warlords that formed a local aristocracy. Control was exerted over a piece of land and, by extension, over the people who lived on that land. Many of the people were tenant peasants or slaves, answerable to the aristocrat who controlled the land on which they lived. There was no sense of a coherent tribe of people and everyone, from ruler down to slave, was defined in terms of their kindred family (the tud) and individual status (braint).

The Roman era had brought Christianity, and the Celtic Britons living in the land that would become Wales, and elsewhere in Britain, were Christian throughout the era, and their legacy is found in the many place names of Wales that are prefixed by Welsh: llan, meaning a holy enclosure or church. The Welsh kingdoms arose in this period, in which the chieftains clashed with one another in internecine warfare, both in the territory that would become Wales (kingdoms such as Gwynedd) and across the Brittonic kingdoms of northern England and southern Scotland (the Hen Ogledd).This was also a time of structural and linguistic divergence from the southwestern peninsula British kingdom of Dumnonia known to the Welsh as Cernyw prior to its eventual absorption into Wessex. Cernyw would become Cornwall and their language would become Cornish. The seventh and eighth centuries were characterised by ongoing warfare by the northern and eastern Welsh kingdoms against the intruding Anglo-Saxon kingdoms of Northumbria and Mercia. That era of struggle saw the Welsh adopt their modern name for themselves, Cymry, meaning "fellow countrymen", and it also saw the demise of all but one of the kindred kingdoms of northern England and southern Scotland at the hands of then-ascendant Northumbria.

One king, Hywel Dda, (translating to 'Howel The Good' in English) came close to uniting Wales as a single nation. He was king of Deheubarth but in 942 he intervened when Idwal Foel of Gwynedd was defeated in battle by Edmund, King of England. He thus took control of Gwynedd and Powys, making him ruler of all Wales except Morgannwg and Gwent. Hywel Dda instituted Welsh law, which was adopted across Wales, even after his kingdom was divided after his death.

=== Irish settlement ===
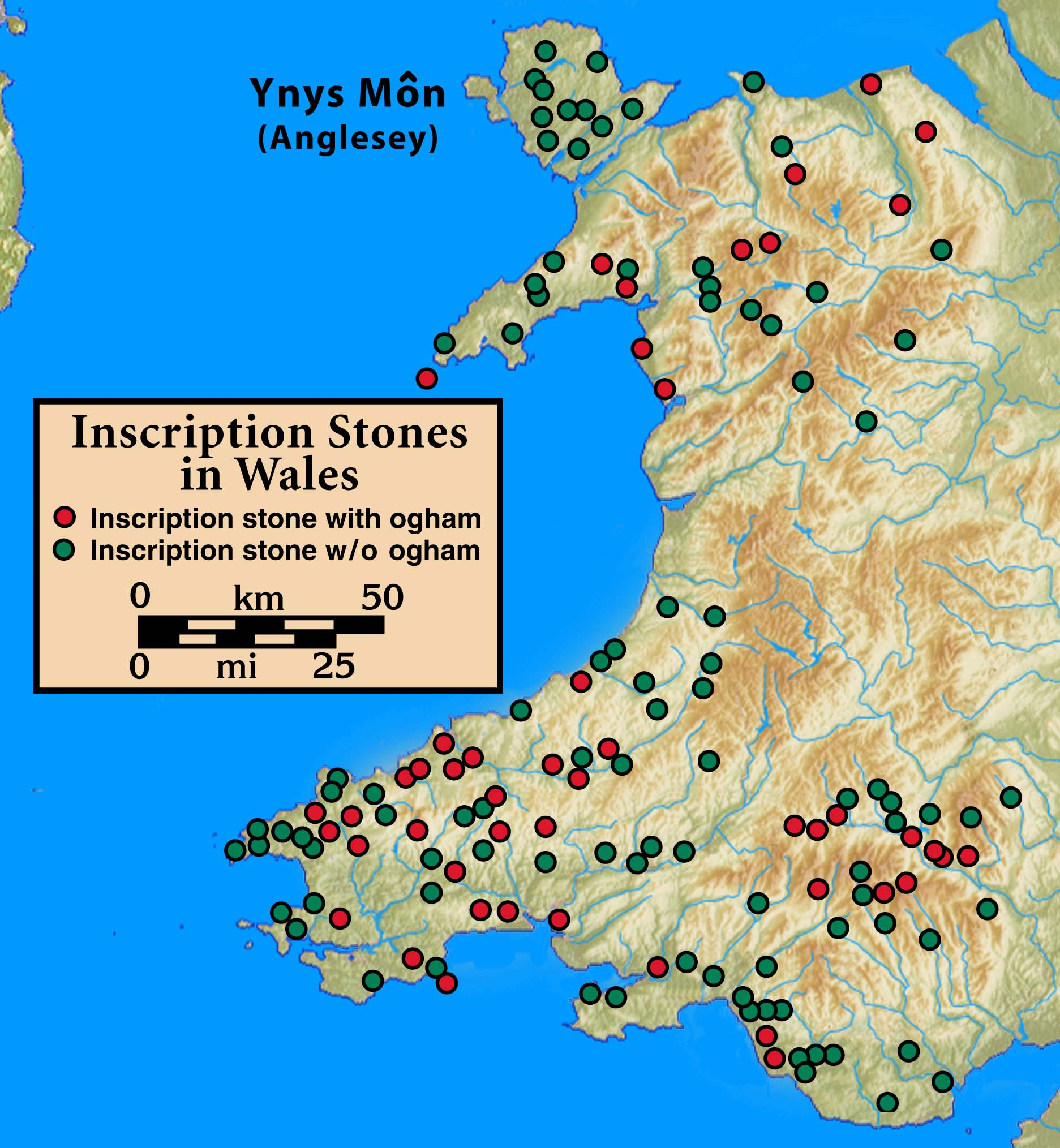

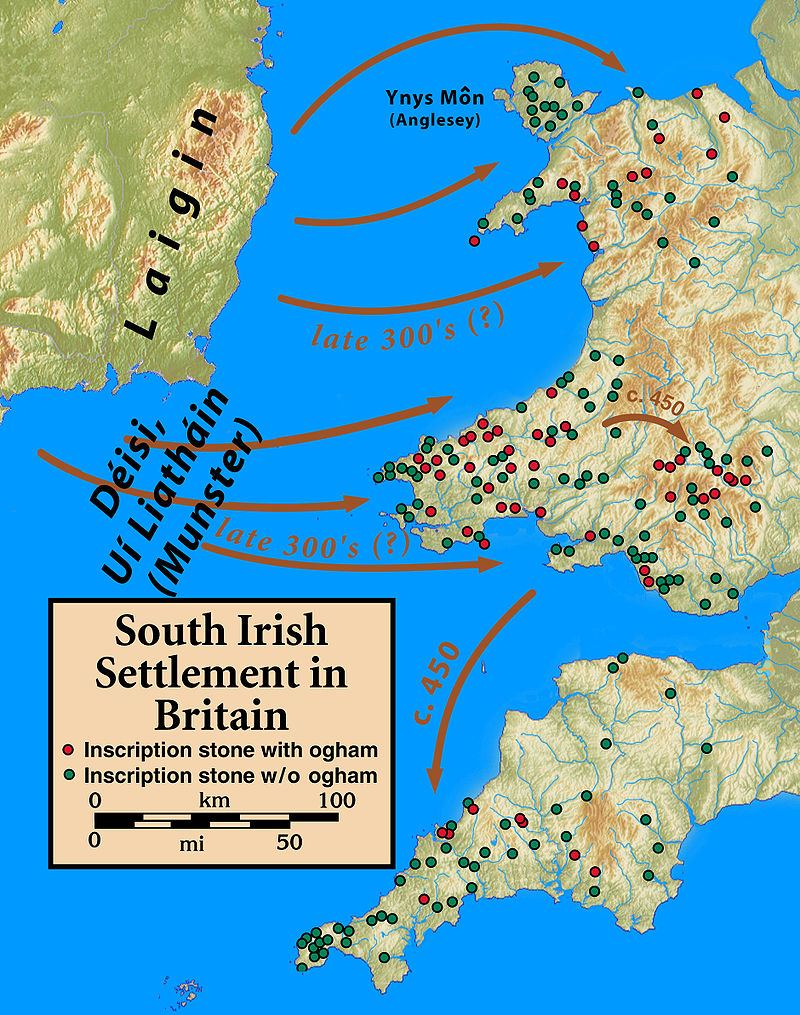

In the late fourth century there was an influx of settlers from southern Ireland, the Uí Liatháin and Laigin (with Déisi participation uncertain), arriving under unknown circumstances but leaving a lasting legacy especially in Dyfed. It is possible that they were invited to settle by the Welsh. There is no evidence of warfare, a bilingual regional heritage suggests peaceful coexistence and intermingling, and the Historia Brittonum written c. 828 notes that a Welsh king had the power to settle foreigners and transfer tracts of land to them. That Roman-era regional rulers were able to exert such power is suggested by the Roman tolerance of native hill forts where there was local leadership under local law and custom. Whatever the circumstances, there is nothing known to connect these settlers either to Roman policy, or to the Irish raiders (the Scoti) of classical Roman accounts.

=== Roman-era legacy ===
Forts and roads are the most visible physical signs of a past Roman presence, along with the coins and Roman-era Latin inscriptions that are associated with Roman military sites. There is a legacy of Romanisation along the coast of southeastern Wales. In that region are found the remains of villas in the countryside. Caerwent and three small urban sites, along with Carmarthen and Roman Monmouth, are the only "urbanised" Roman sites in Wales. This region was placed under Roman civil administration (civitates) in the mid-second century, with the rest of Wales being under military administration throughout the Roman era. There are a number of borrowings from the Latin lexicon into Welsh, and while there are Latin-derived words with legal meaning in popular usage such as pobl ("people"), the technical words and concepts used in describing Welsh law in the Middle Ages are native Welsh, and not of Roman origin.

There is ongoing debate as to the extent of a lasting Roman influence being applicable to the early Middle Ages in Wales, and while the conclusions about Welsh history are important, Wendy Davies has questioned the relevance of the debates themselves by noting that whatever Roman provincial administration might have survived in places, it eventually became a new system appropriate to the time and place, and not a "hangover of archaic practices".

=== Earliest kingdoms ===
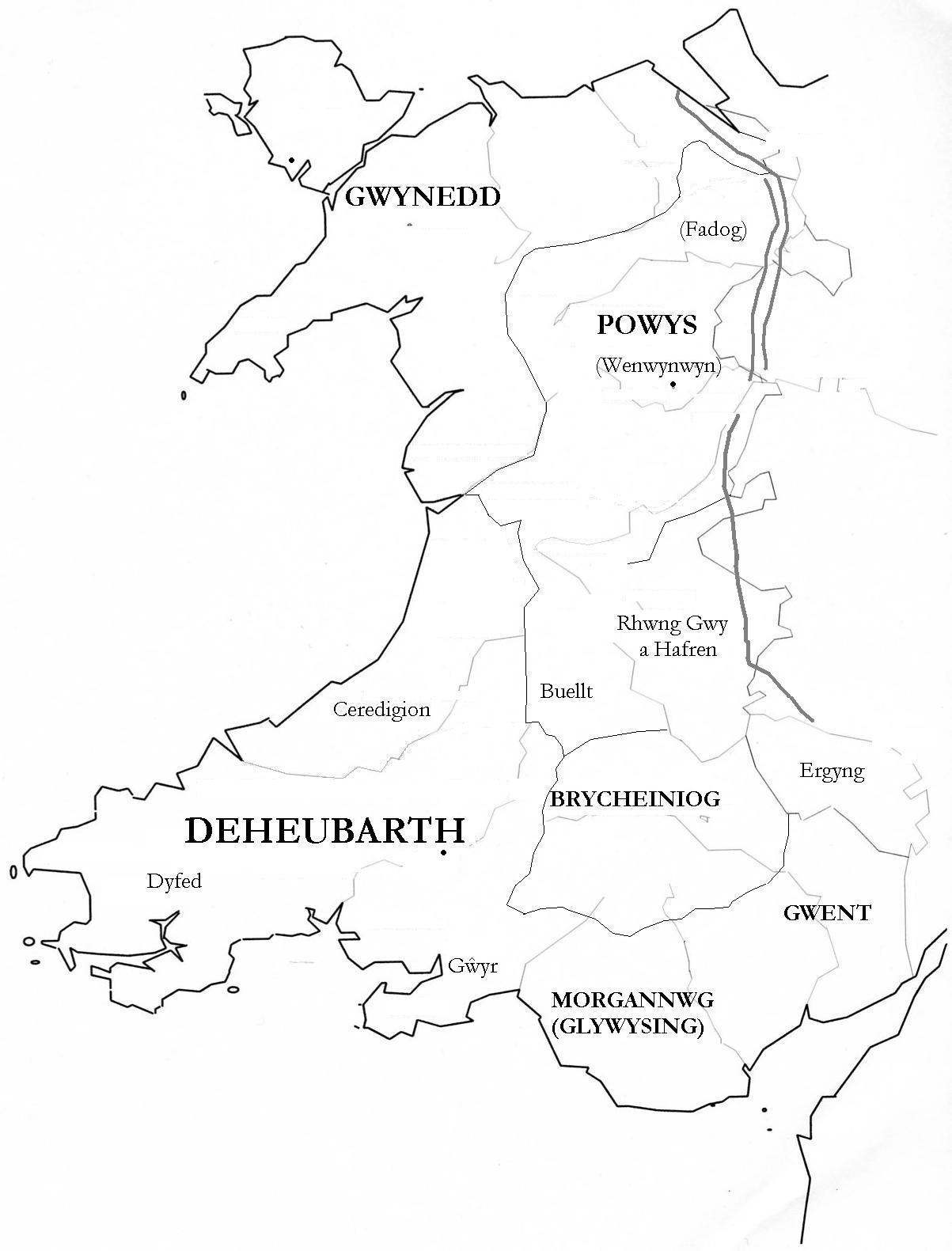
Medieval kingdoms of Wales are shown within the boundaries of the present-day country of Wales and not inclusive of all.

The exact origins and extent of the early kingdoms are speculative. The conjectured minor kings of the sixth century held small areas within a radius of perhaps 24 km (15 mi), probably near the coast. Throughout the era there was dynastic strengthening in some areas while new kingdoms emerged and then disappeared in others. There is no reason to suppose that every part of Wales was part of kingdom even as late as 700.

Dyfed is the same land of the Demetae shown on Ptolemy's map c. 150 during the Roman era. The fourth century arrival of Irish settlers intertwined the royal genealogies of Wales and Ireland, with Dyfed's rulers appearing in The Expulsion of the Déisi, Harleian MS. 5389 and Jesus College MS. 20. Its king Vortiporius was one of the kings condemned by Gildas in his De Excidio et Conquestu Britanniae, c. 540.

While the better documented southeast shows a long and slow acquisition of property and power by the dynasty of Meurig ap Tewdrig in connection with the kingdoms of Glywysing, Gwent and Ergyng, there is a near-complete absence of information about many other areas. The earliest known name of a king of Ceredigion was Cereticiaun, who died in 807, and none of the mid-Welsh kingdoms can be evidenced before the eighth century. There are mentions of Brycheiniog and Gwrtheyrnion (near Buellt) in that era, but for the latter it is difficult to say whether it had either an earlier or a later existence.

The early history in the north and east are somewhat better known, with Gwynedd having a semi-legendary origin in the arrival of Cunedda from Manau Gododdin in the fifth century (an inscribed sixth century gravestone records the earliest known mention of the kingdom). Its king Maelgwn Gwynedd was one of the kings condemned by Gildas in his De Excidio et Conquestu Britanniae, c. 540. There may also have been sixth-century kingdoms in Rhos, Meirionydd and Dunoding, all associated with Gwynedd.

The name of Powys is not certainly used before the ninth century, but its earlier existence (perhaps under a different name) is reasonably inferred by the fact that Selyf ap Cynan (d. 616) and his grandfather are in the Harleian genealogies as the family of the known later kings of Powys, and Selyf's father Cynan ap Brochwel appears in poems attributed to Taliesen, where he is described as leading successful raids throughout Wales. Seventh-century Pengwern is associated with the later Powys through the poems of Canu Heledd, which name sites from Shropshire to Dogfeiling to Newtown in lamenting the demise of Pengwern's king Cynddylan; but the poem's geography probably reflects the time of its composition, around the ninth or tenth century rather that Cynddylan's own time.

== Geography ==
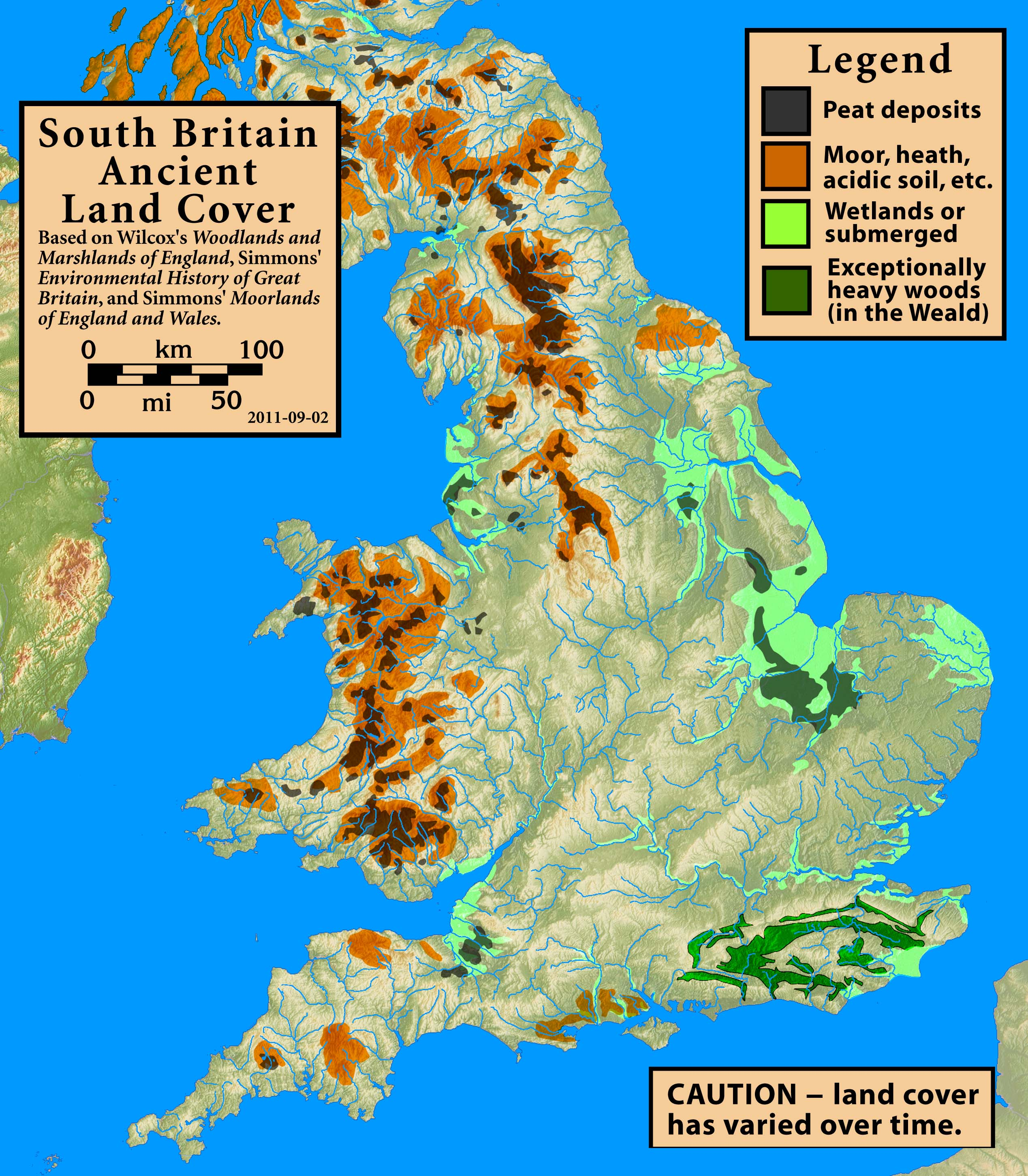
Ancient land cover of southern Britain.

The total area of Wales is 20,779 km^{2} (8,023 sq mi). Much of the landscape is mountainous with treeless moors and heath, and having large areas with peat deposits. There is approximately 1,200 km (746 mi) of coastline and some 50 offshore islands, the largest of which is Anglesey. The present climate is wet and maritime, with warm summers and mild winters, much like the later medieval climate, though there was a significant change to cooler and much wetter conditions in the early part of the era. (Note: The same change in climate was occurring around the entire North Sea periphery at this time. See Higham's Rome, Britain and the Anglo-Saxons (ISBN 1-85264-022-7, 1992): cooler, wetter climate and abandonment of British uplands and marginal lands; Berglund's Human impact and climate changes—synchronous events and a causal link? in "Quaternary International", Vol. 105 (2003): Scandinavia, 500AD wetter and rapidly cooling climate and the retreat of agriculture; Ejstrud's The Migration Period, Southern Denmark and the North Sea (ISBN 978-87-992214-1-7, 2008): p28, from the 6th century onwards farmlands in Denmark and Norway were abandoned; Issar's Climate changes during the holocene and their impact on Hydrological systems (ISBN 978-0-511-06118-9, 2003): water level rise along NW coast of Europe, wetter conditions in Scandinavia and retreat of farming in Norway after 400, cooler climate in Scotland; Louwe Kooijmans' Archaeology and Coastal Change in the Netherlands (in Archaeology and Coastal Change, 1980): rising water levels along the NW coast of Europe; Louwe Kooijmans' The Rhine/Meuse Delta (PhD thesis, 1974): rising water levels along the NW coast of Europe, and in the Fens and Humber Estuary. Abundant material from other sources portrays the same information.) The southeastern coast was originally a wetland, but reclamation has been ongoing since the Roman era.

There are deposits of gold, copper, lead, silver and zinc, and these have been exploited since the Iron Age, especially so in the Roman era. In the Roman era some granite was quarried, as was slate in the north and sandstone in the east and south.

Native fauna included large and small mammals, such as the brown bear, wolf, wildcat, rodents, several species of weasel, and shrews, voles and many species of bat. There were many species of birds, fish and shellfish.

The early medieval human population has always been considered relatively low in comparison to England, but efforts to reliably quantify it have yet to provide widely acceptable results.

== Subsistence ==
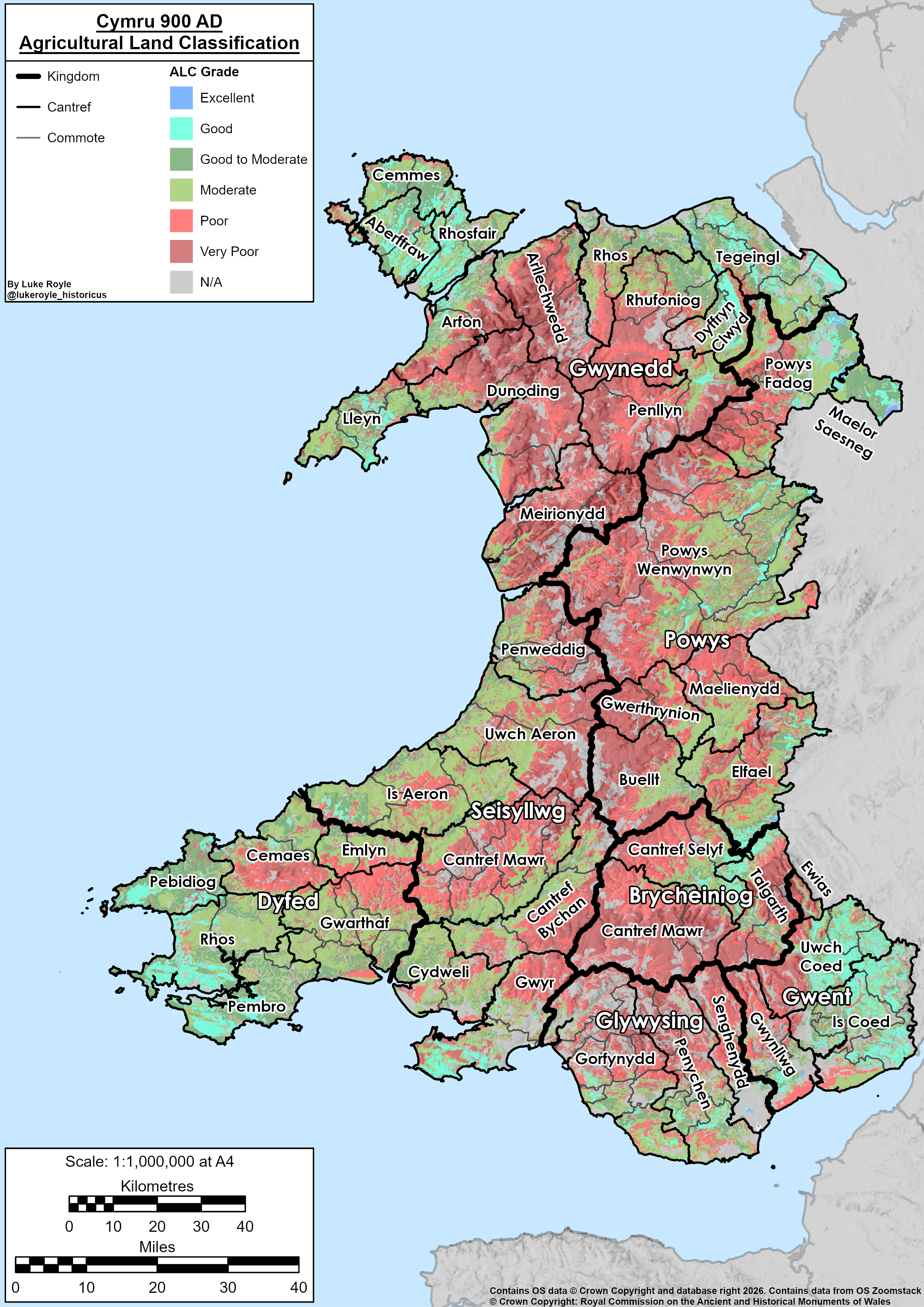
900 AD Boundaries with present day Welsh Government Agricultural Land Classifications

Much of the arable land is in the south, southeast, southwest, on Anglesey, and along the coast. However, specifying the ancient usage of land is problematic in that there is little surviving evidence on which to base the estimates. Forest clearance has taken place since the Iron Age, and it is not known how the ancient people of Wales determined the best use of the land for their particular circumstances, such as in their preference for wheat, oats, rye or barley depending on rainfall, growing season, temperature and the characteristics of the land on which they lived. Anglesey is the exception, historically producing more grain than any other part of Wales.

Animal husbandry included the raising of cattle, pigs, sheep and a lesser number of goats. Oxen were kept for ploughing, asses for beasts of burden and horses for human transport. The importance of sheep was less than in later centuries, as their extensive grazing in the uplands did not begin until the thirteenth century. The animals were tended by swineherds and herdsmen, but they were not confined, even in the lowlands. Instead open land was used for feeding, and seasonal transhumance was practised. In addition, bees were kept for the production of honey.

== Society ==
=== Kindred family ===
The importance of blood relationships, particularly in relation to birth and noble descent, was heavily stressed in medieval Wales. Claims of dynastic legitimacy rested on it, and an extensive patrilinear genealogy was used to assess fines and penalties under Welsh law. Different degrees of blood relationship were important for different circumstances, all based upon the cenedl (kindred). The nuclear family (parents and children) was especially important, while the pencenedl (head of the family within four patrilinear generations) held special status, representing the family in transactions and having certain unique privileges under the law. Under extraordinary circumstances the genealogical interest could be stretched quite far: for the serious matter of homicide, all of the fifth cousins of a kindred (the seventh generation: the patrilinear descendants of a common great-great-great-great-grandfather) were ultimately liable for satisfying any penalty.

=== Land and political entities ===
The Welsh referred to themselves in terms of their territory and not in the sense of a tribe. Thus there was Gwenhwys ("Gwent" with a group-identifying suffix) and gwyr Guenti ("men of Gwent") and Broceniauc ("men of Brycheiniog"). Welsh custom contrasted with many Irish and Anglo-Saxon contexts, where the territory was named for the people living there (Connaught for the Connachta, Essex for the East Saxons). This is aside from the origin of a territory's name, such as in the custom of attributing it to an eponymous founder (Glywysing for Glywys, Ceredigion for Ceredig).

The Welsh term for a political entity was gwlad ("country") and it expressed the notion of a "sphere of rule" with a territorial component. The Latin equivalent seems to be regnum, which referred to the "changeable, expandable, contractable sphere of any ruler's power". Rule tended to be defined in relation to a territory that might be held and protected, or expanded or contracted, though the territories themselves were specific pieces of land and not synonyms for the gwlad.

Throughout the Middle Ages the Welsh used a variety of words for rulers, with the specific words used varying over time, and with literary sources generally using different terms than annalistic ones. Latin language texts used Latin language terms while vernacular texts used Welsh terms. Not only did the specific terms vary, the meaning of those specific terms varied over time as well. For example, brenin was one of the terms used for a king in the twelfth century. The earlier, original meaning of brenin was simply a person of status.

Kings are sometimes described as overkings, but the definition of what that meant is unclear, whether referring to a king with definite powers, or to ideas of someone considered to have high status.

=== Kingship ===
Wales in the early Middle Ages was a society with a landed warrior aristocracy, and after c. 500 Welsh politics were dominated by kings with territorial kingdoms. The legitimacy of the kingship was of paramount importance, the legitimate attainment of power was by dynastic inheritance or military proficiency. A king had to be considered effective and be associated with wealth, either his own or by distributing it to others, and those considered to be at the top level were required to have wisdom, perfection, and a long reach. Literary sources stressed martial qualities such as military capability, bold horsemanship, leadership, the ability to extend boundaries and to make conquests, along with an association with wealth and generosity. Clerical sources stressed obligations such as respect for Christian principles, providing defence and protection, pursuing thieves and imprisoning offenders, persecuting evildoers, and making judgements.

The relationship among people that is most appropriate to the warrior aristocracy is clientship and flexibility, and not one of sovereignty or absolute power, nor necessarily of long duration. Prior to the tenth century, power was held on a local level, and the limits of that power varied by region. There were at least two restraints on the limits of power: the combined will of the ruler's people (his "subjects"), and the authority of the Christian church. There is little to explain the meaning of "subject" beyond noting that those under a ruler owed an assessment (effectively, taxes) and military service when demanded, while they were owed protection by the ruler.

=== Kings ===
For much of the early medieval period kings had few functions except military ones. Kings made war and gave judgements (in consultation with local elders) but they did not govern in any sense of that word. From the sixth to the eleventh centuries the king moved about with an armed, mounted warband, a personal military retinue called a teulu that is described as a "small, swift-moving, and close-knit group". This military elite formed the core of any larger army that might be assembled. The relationships among the king and the members of his warband were personal, and the practice of fosterage strengthened those personal bonds.

=== Aristocracy ===
Power was held at a local level by families who controlled the land and the people who lived on that land. They are differentiated legally by having a higher sarhaed (the penalty for insult) than the general populace, by the records of their transactions (such as land transfers) by their participation in local judgements and administration, and by their consultative role in judgements made by the king.

References to the social stratification that defines an aristocracy are widely found in Welsh literature and law. A man's privilege was assessed in terms of his braint (status), of which there were two kinds (birth and office), and in terms of his superior's importance. Two men might each be an uchelwr (high man), but a king is higher than a breyr (a regional leader), so legal compensation for the loss to a king's bondsman (aillt) was higher than the equivalent loss to the bondsman of a breyr. Early sources stressed birth and function as the determinators of nobility, and not by the factor of wealth that later became associated with an aristocracy.

=== Populace ===
The populace included a hereditary tenant peasantry who were not slaves or serfs, but were less than free. Gwas ("servant", boy) referred to a dependent in perpetual servitude, but who was not bound to labour service (i.e., serfdom). Nor can the person be considered a vassal except perhaps as a clerical self-description, as in the 'vassal of a saint'. The early existence of the concept suggests a stratum of bound dependents in the post-Roman era. The proportion of the medieval population that consisted of freemen or free peasant proprietors is undetermined, even for the pre-Conquest period.

Slavery existed in Wales as it did elsewhere throughout the era. Slaves were in the bottom stratum of society, with hereditary slavery more common than penal slavery. Slaves might form part of the payment in a transaction made between those of higher rank. It was possible for them to buy their freedom, and an example of manumission at Llandeilo Fawr is given in a ninth-century marginalia note of the Lichfield Gospels. Their relative numbers is a matter of guess and conjecture.

== Christianity ==
The religious culture of Wales was overwhelmingly Christian in the early Middle Ages. Pastoral care of the laity was necessarily rural in Wales, as it was in other Celtic regions. In Wales the clergy consisted of monks, orders and non-monastic clergy, all appearing in different periods and in different contexts. There were three major orders consisting of bishops (episcopi), priests (presbyteri) and deacons, as well as several minor ones. Bishops had some temporal authority, but not necessarily in the sense of a full diocese.

=== Communities ===
Monasticism is known in Britain in the fifth century though its origins are obscure. The Church seemed episcopally dominated and largely consisting of monasteries. The size of the religious communities is unknown (Bede and the Welsh Triads suggest they were large, the Lives of the Saints suggest they were small, but these are not considered credible sources on the matter). The different communities were pre-eminent within small spheres of influence (ie, within physical proximity of the communities). The known sites are mostly coastal, situated on good land. There are passing references to monks and monasteries in the sixth century (for example, Gildas said that Maelgwn Gwynedd had originally intended to be a monk). From the seventh century onward there are few references to monks but more frequent references to 'disciples'.

=== Institutions ===
Archaeological evidence consists partly of the ruined remains of institutions, and in finds of inscriptions and the long cyst burials that are characteristic of post-Roman Christian Britons.

These long cyst burials occur in the southern Scottish lowlands, Wales, and the West Country of England. The grave is lined with stones, there are no grave goods, they often have an east-west orientation, and they date from a time before churches were commonly attached to cemeteries. They contrast with Anglo-Saxon burials, which followed a different inhumation custom.

The records of transactions and legal references provide information on the status of the clergy and its institutions. Landed proprietorship was the basis of support and income for all clerical communities, exploiting agriculture (crops), herding (sheep, pigs, goats), infrastructure (barns, threshing floors), and employing stewards to supervise the labour. Lands that were not adjacent to the communities provided income in the form of (in effect) a business of landlordship. Lands under clerical proprietorship were exempt from the fiscal demands of kings and secular lords. They had the power of nawdd (protection, as from legal process) and were noddfa (a "nawdd place" or sanctuary). Clerical power was moral and spiritual, and this was sufficient to enforce recognition of their status and to demand compensation for any infringement on their rights and privileges.

=== Bede's Ecclesiastical History ===
The notion of a separate Anglo-Saxon and British approach to Christianity dates back at least to Bede. He portrayed the Synod of Whitby (in 664) as a set-piece battle between competing Celtic and Roman religious interests. While the synod was an important event in the history of England and brought finality to several issues in Anglo-Saxon Britain, Bede probably overemphasised its significance so as to stress the unity of the English Church.

Bede's characterisation of Saint Augustine's meeting with seven British bishops and the monks of Bangor Is Coed (in 602–604) portrays the bishop of Canterbury as chosen by Rome to lead in Britain, while portraying the British clergy as being in opposition to Rome. He then adds a prophecy that the British church would be destroyed. His apocryphal prophecy of destruction is quickly fulfilled by the massacre of the Christian monks at Bangor Is Coed by the Northumbrians (c. 615), shortly after the meeting with Saint Augustine. Bede describes the massacre immediately following his delivery of the prophecy.

=== 'Celtic' vs. 'Roman' myth ===
One consequence of the Protestant Reformation and subsequent ethnic and religious discord in Britain and Ireland was the promotion of the idea of a 'Celtic' church that was different from and at odds with the 'Roman' church, and that held to certain offensive customs, especially in the dating of Easter, the tonsure, and the liturgy. Scholars have noted the partisan motives and inaccuracy of the characterisation, as has The Catholic Encyclopedia, which also explains that the Britons using the 'Celtic Rite' in the early Middle Ages were in communion with Rome.

== Cymry: Welsh identity forms ==
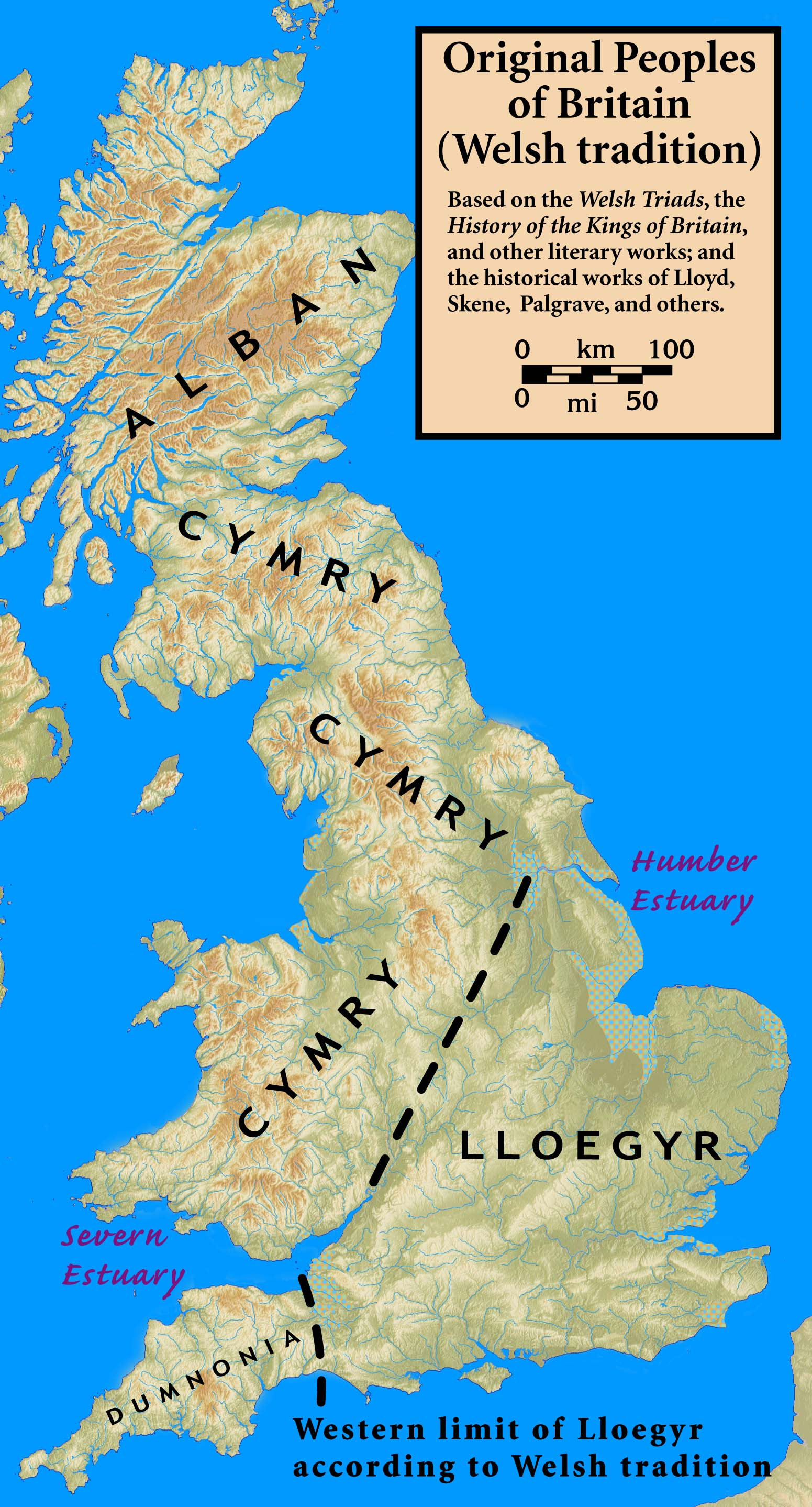
The peoples of Britain according to medieval Welsh tradition.

The early Middle Ages saw the creation and adoption of the modern Welsh name for themselves, Cymry, a word descended from Common Brittonic combrogi, meaning "fellow-countrymen". It appears in Moliant Cadwallon (In Praise of Cadwallon), a poem written by Cadwallon ap Cadfan's bard Afan Ferddig c. 633, and probably came into use a self-description before the seventh century. Historically the word applies to both the Welsh and the Brythonic-speaking peoples of northern England and southern Scotland, the peoples of the Hen Ogledd, and emphasises a perception that the Welsh and the "Men of the North" were one people, exclusive of all others. Universal acceptance of the term as the preferred written one came slowly in Wales, eventually supplanting the earlier Brython or Brittones. The term was not applied to the Cornish people or the Bretons, who share a similar heritage, culture and language with the Welsh and the Men of the North. Rhys adds that the Bretons sometimes give the simple brô the sense of compatriot.

All of the Cymry shared a similar language, culture and heritage. Their histories are stories of warrior kings waging war, and they are intertwined in a way that is independent of physical location, in no way dissimilar to the way that the histories of neighboring Gwynedd and Powys are intertwined. Kings of Gwynedd campaigned against Brythonic opponents in the north. Sometimes the kings of different kingdoms acted in concert, as is told in the literary Y Gododdin. Much of the early Welsh poetry and literature was written in the Old North by northern Cymry.

All of the northern kingdoms and people were eventually absorbed into the kingdoms of England and Scotland, and their histories are now mostly a footnote in the histories of those later kingdoms, though vestiges of the Cymry past are occasionally visible. In Scotland the fragmentary remains of the Laws of the Bretts and Scotts show Brythonic influence, and some of these were copied into the Regiam Majestatem, the oldest surviving written digest of Scots law, where can be found the 'galnes' (galanas) that is familiar to Welsh law.

== See also ==
- Matter of Britain
- Medieval Welsh literature
