= Owain Danwyn =

King of Rhos in the mid-5th century

Owain Danwyn (fl. 440) was a king of Rhos in Gwynedd, northwestern Wales, in the mid-5th century. He was the son of Einion Yrth ap Cunedda and the father of Cynlas Goch, probably the Cuneglasus excoriated by Gildas. Very little is known of his life. Graham Phillips and Martin Keatman proposed a theory that he was the historical figure behind the legend of King Arthur.

== History ==
Owain Danwyn (Old Welsh Dantguin, also spelled Ddanwyn, Ddantgwyn, etc., meaning "White Tooth"), is known from several medieval genealogies of the kings of Rhos. Most of these concur that he was the son of Einion Yrth ap Cunedda and grandson of Cunedda, founder of the Gwynedd dynasty in North Wales. His brother was Cadwallon Lawhir ap Einion, known from the Gwynedd pedigrees. Owain was the father of Cynlas Goch, who is identified with the prince named Cuneglasus who Gildas castigated for his various sins in De Excidio et Conquestu Britanniae. According to the Bonedd y Saint, a genealogy of British saints, Owain was also the father of the saints Einion Frenin, Seiriol and Meirion, and in some versions, Hawystl Gloff.

According to Gildas, Maelgwn, the son of Owain's brother Cadwallon, took the throne of Gwynedd by murdering an uncle. Peter Bartrum suggests this may have been Owain, though he notes that Gildas' term avunculus typically refers to a maternal uncle.

== See also ==
- Family tree of Welsh monarchs
