= De Excidio et Conquestu Britanniae =

6th century sermon by Gildas

- On the Ruin and Conquest of Britain
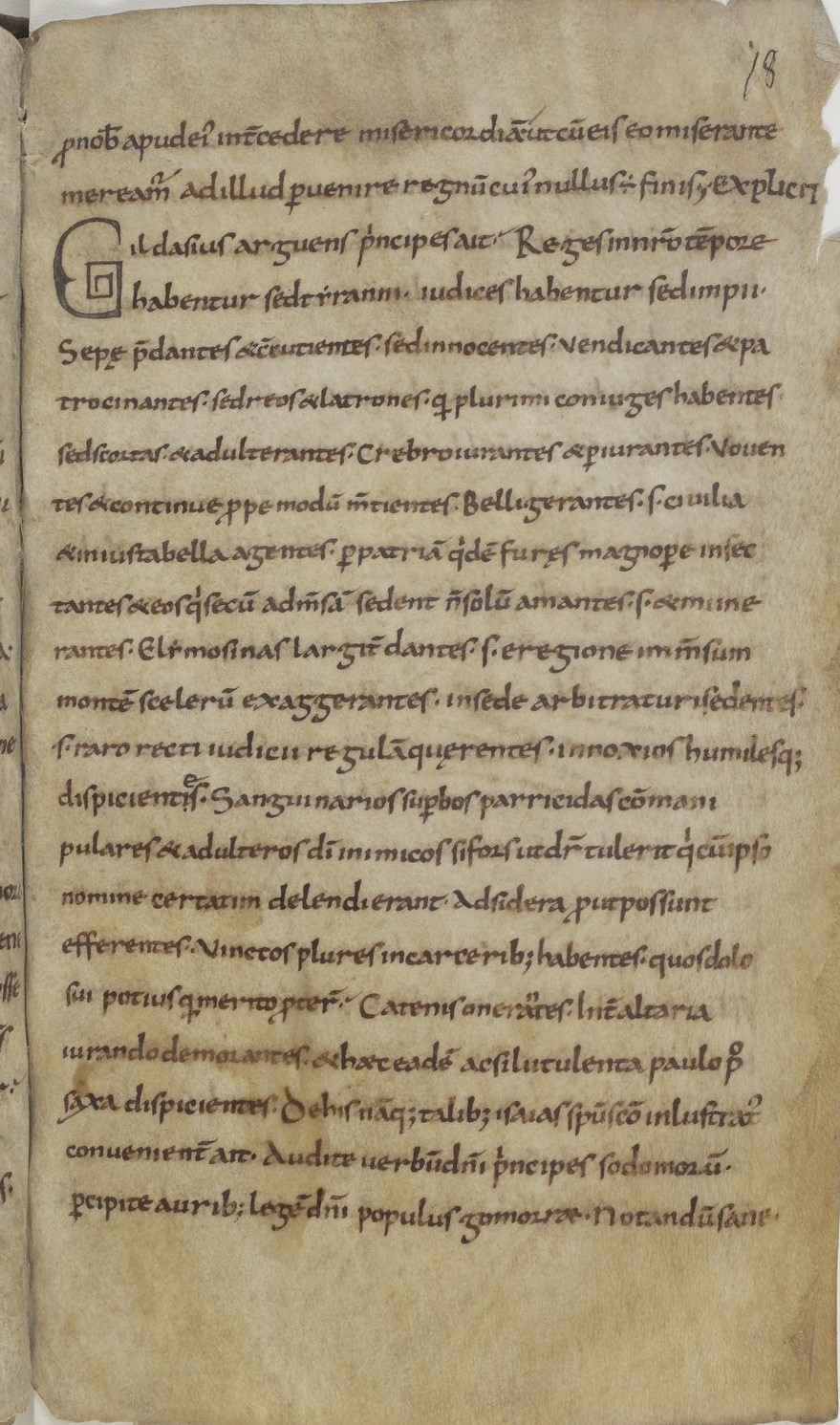
- A ninth-century manuscript containing De Excidio, displayed at the Reims Municipal Library
- Full title: De excidio et conquestu Britanniae ac flebili castigatione in reges, principes et sacerdotes
- Author(s): Gildas
- Language: British Latin
- Date: Disputed (fifth to sixth century AD)
- Manuscript(s): five extant manuscripts: British Library, Cotton MS Vitellius A. VI (c. tenth century AD) (Note: Manuscript suffered damage from fire in 1731); Reims Municipal Library, MS 414 (c. ninth century AD); Avranches Public Library, MS 162 (c. twelfth century AD); Cambridge University Library, Ff. i.27 (c. thirteenth century AD); Cambridge University Library, MS. Dd. I. 17 (c. fifteenth century AD)
- First printed edition: 1525 by Polidoro Virgili
- Genre: Sermon
- Text: De Excidio et Conquestu Britanniae at Wikisource

De Excidio et Conquestu Britanniae (Note: Also written as De Excidio et Conquestu Britanniæ with the ligature æ; The full title is De excidio et conquestu Britanniae ac flebili castigatione in reges, principes et sacerdotes) (English: On the Ruin and Conquest of Britain) (Note: Sometimes just On the Ruin of Britain) is a work written in Latin in the late fifth or sixth century by the British religious polemicist Gildas. It is a sermon in three parts condemning the acts of Gildas' contemporaries, both secular and religious, whom he blames for the dire state of affairs in sub-Roman Britain. It is widely acknowledged by historians that the text cannot be straightforwardly used to construct a reliable narrative history of fifth- and sixth-century Britain. It nevertheless is one of the most important sources for the history of Britain in the fifth and sixth centuries, as it is the only significant historical source for the period written by a near contemporary of the people and events described.

Part I contains a narrative of British history from the Roman conquest to Gildas' time; it includes references to Ambrosius Aurelianus and the Britons' victory against the Saxons at the Battle of Mons Badonicus. Part II is a condemnation of five kings for their various sins, including both obscure figures and relatively well-documented ones such as Maelgwn Gwynedd. Part III is a similar attack upon the British clergy of the age.

== Date ==
Gildas's work is of great importance to historians, because, although it is not intended primarily as history, it is almost the only surviving source written by a near-contemporary of British events in the fifth and sixth centuries. The usual date that has been given for the composition of the work is some time in the 540s, but it is now regarded as quite possibly earlier, in the first quarter of the sixth century, or even before that. The historian Karen George, in her study of Gildas' text, suggests a date range of c. 510–530 AD, while the historian Stephen Joyce argues for c. 483–485 AD. In the view of the historian Guy Halsall:

There is some evidence for an "early Gildas", writing in the late fifth century. This includes Gildas' rhetorical education, his Latin style, his theological concerns, and a rereading of his historical section and his place within it. I tend towards this interpretation, although it cannot be proven. It is unlikely that Gildas wrote before 480/490 or much after about 550; beyond that we cannot go.

Despite this uncertainty, most scholars continue to favour a date c. 530–545, as supported by reports of the death of Gildas in the various Welsh and Irish annals: the Annales Cambriæ gives the year of his death as 570, while the Annals of Tigernach dates his death to 569. Andrew Breeze argues that Gildas was writing De Excidio in 536, in the middle of the extreme weather events of 535–536, because he mentions a "certain thick mist and black night" which "sits upon the whole island" of Britain. Breeze's hypothesis is disputed. Stephen Joyce argues that arguments in favour of close dating are based on circular reasoning, and proposes returning to the broad range accepted in the twentieth century of 479–550 AD.

Gildas' intent in his writing was to preach to his contemporaries in the manner of an Old Testament prophet, not to write an account for posterity. Thus, he gives historical details where it serves his purpose; for instance, he offers one of the first descriptions of Hadrian's Wall and perhaps the Antonine Wall, though his account of their history appears to be inaccurate. However, he omits details where they do not contribute to his message; he is consistently vague, giving few names and no firm dates. Nonetheless, De Excidio remains an important work not only for medieval history but also for British history in general, as it is one of the few works written in Britain to survive from the fifth or sixth centuries.

In a convoluted passage in De Excidio et Conquestu Britanniae, Gildas can be interpreted as equating the year of his birth with the same year as the Battle of Mons Badonicus, which might have taken place in 482 AD.

== Manuscripts and editions ==
The oldest manuscript of the De Excidio is Cottonian MS. Vitellius A. VI, of the tenth century, damaged by fire in 1731, but used by Theodor Mommsen in his edition nevertheless. Other manuscripts include the Avranches public library MS. No. 162 of the twelfth century, the Cambridge University Library MS. Ff. I. 27 of the twelfth century, and the Cambridge University Library MS. Dd. I. 17 of c. 1400. Cambridge Ff. I. 27 is the recension of a certain Cormac and differs sharply from the other manuscripts in that it contains a shortened form of various parts and has many textual readings peculiar to itself. The oldest attestation of Gildas's work is actually found in the extensive quotations and paraphrases of the De Excidio made by Bede in his Ecclesiastical History of the English People, the earliest manuscripts of which date to the eighth century.

Gildas's treatise was first published in 1525 by Polydore Vergil but with many avowed alterations and omissions. In 1568 John Joscelyn, secretary to Archbishop Parker, issued a new edition of it more in conformity with manuscript authority; and in 1691 a still more carefully revised edition by Thomas Gale appeared at Oxford. It was frequently reprinted on the Continent during the 16th century, and once or twice since. The next English edition, described by August Potthast as editio pessima, was published by the English Historical Society in 1838, and edited by the Rev. J. Stevenson. The text of Gildas founded on Gale's edition collated with two other manuscripts, with elaborate introductions, is included in the Monumenta Historica Britannica. Another edition is in Arthur West Haddan and William Stubbs, Councils and ecclesiastical documents relating to Great Britain and Ireland (Oxford, 1869); the latest edition is that by Mommsen in Monumenta Germaniae Historica auct. antiq. xiii. (Chronica min. iii.), 1898. The text as it is used today is thus a scholarly reconstruction; the prime witness and possibly the entire manuscript stemma may not actually preserve the original page order of the autograph.

== Summary ==
=== Part I ===
The first part consists of Gildas' explanation for his work and a brief narrative of Roman Britain from its conquest under the principate to Gildas' time:

Concerning her obstinacy, subjection and rebellion, about her second subjection and harsh servitude; concerning religion, of persecution, the holy martyrs, many heresies, of tyrants, of two plundering races, concerning the defense and a further devastation, of a second vengeance and a third devastation, concerning hunger, of the letter to Agitius [usually identified with the patrician Flavius Aetius], of victory, of crimes, of enemies suddenly announced, a memorable plague, a council, an enemy more savage than the first, the subversion of cities, concerning those whose survived, and concerning the final victory of our country that has been granted to our time by the will of God.

Part I is the earliest source to describe the invitation by the Roman authorities of the Saxons to Britain, which Gildas describes using language closely related to Roman legal processes for settling barbarian foederati. He is also particularly notable as the earliest source to mention Ambrosius Aurelianus, an important figure of British tradition credited with turning the tide against the Anglo-Saxon conquest. It also contains the earliest mention of the Britons' victory at the Battle of Mons Badonicus.

It is a matter of dispute whether Gildas named the "proud tyrant" (superbus tyrannus) who invited the Saxons to Britain as Vortigern, as not all manuscripts contain the name. Theodor Mommsen believed that Gildas did not use the name Vortigern, and that in those manuscripts where it appears, it is an interpolation derived from Bede's Ecclesiastical History. Mommsen's 1898 edition of the text in Monumenta Germaniae Historica omits it, and his view has been influential in later scholarship. Some scholars, such as David Dumville or Bernard Bachrach, preferring to rely on the continental manuscripts rather than MS. Vitellius A. VI, have argued that the possibility remains that Vortigern is original to Gildas. Others have followed Mommsen's interpretation on the absence of Vortigern, or provided further reasons to dispute an association of the "proud tyrant" with Vortigern. Scholars generally acknowledge that the matter cannot be settled without the completion of a new edition.

=== Part II ===
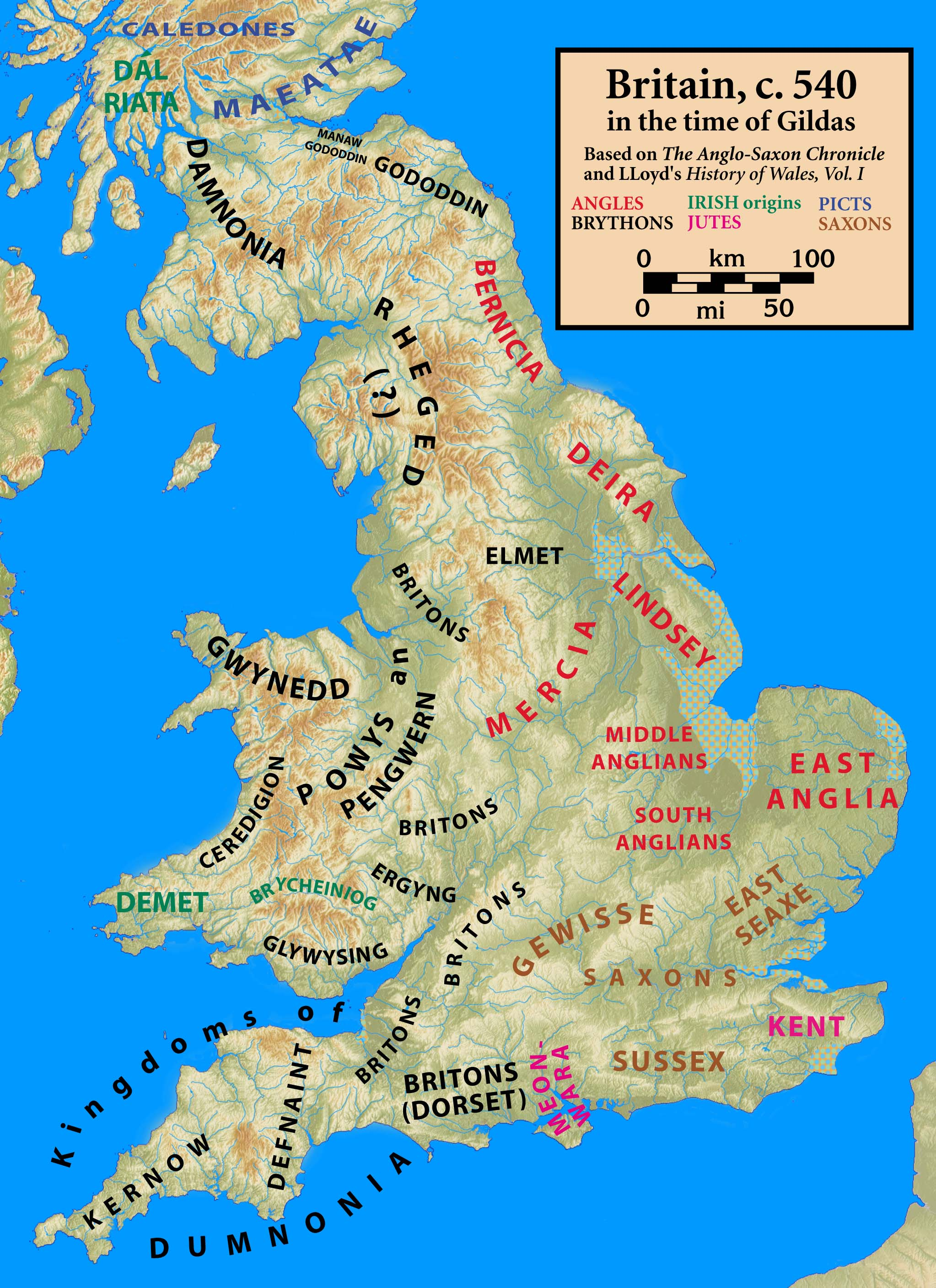

The second part consists of a condemnation of five British kings, and as it is the only contemporary information about them, it is of particular interest to scholars of British history. Gildas swathes the condemnations in allegorical beasts from the Book of Daniel and the Book of Revelation, likening the kings to the beasts described there: a lion, a leopard, a bear, and a dragon. The kings excoriated by Gildas are:

- "Constantine the tyrannical whelp of the unclean lioness of Damnonia".
- "thou lion's whelp Aurelius Conanus".
- "Vortipore ... who like to the spotted leopard ... tyrant of the Demetians";
- "Cuneglasse ... thou bear".
- "dragon of the island ... Maglocune".

The reason for Gildas's disaffection for these individuals is unknown. He was selective in his choice of kings, as he had no comments concerning the kings of the other British kingdoms that were thriving at the time, such as Rheged, Gododdin, Glywysing, Brycheiniog, Ceredigion, Powys, Elmet, or the kingdoms of southern England.

Constantine is obscure. His Damnonia is generally identified with the kingdom of Dumnonia in present-day South West England. A number of later traditions refer to a king of this name in the area. Some scholars note the possibility that Gildas instead intended the area of the Damnonii in western Scotland, though Thomas D. O'Sullivan considers this unlikely.

Aurelius Conanus, also called Caninus, cannot be connected to any particular region of Britain. John Edward Lloyd suggests a connection between this king and the descendants of the great hero Ambrosius Aurelianus mentioned previously by Gildas; if this is true his kingdom may have been located somewhere in territory subsequently taken by the Anglo-Saxons. If the form Caninus should be connected with the Cuna(g)nus found in 6th-century writings, the result in the later royal genealogies would be Cynan, a commonly occurring name. However, this is a speculation.

Vortiporius (Vortipore, Old Welsh Guortepir) was a king of Demetia (Dyfed) who is well-attested in both Welsh and Irish genealogies, the son of Aircol. Though it is not easily supportable on linguistic grounds, some scholars maintain that he is mentioned on a memorial stone (discovered in 1895) bearing an inscriptions in both Latin and ogham. The Latin inscription reads Memoria Voteporigis protictoris. The ogham inscription consists of a Primitive Irish spelling of the name: Votecorigas. If the man mentioned in both inscriptions was the same as Gildas' Vortiporius, we would expect the Latin and Irish forms to have been spelled *Vorteporigis and *Vortecorigas, respectively; the difference in spelling has led some to suggest that they are not the same person, though it is possible that they were related.

Cuneglasse is the Cynglas (modern Welsh: Cynlas) of the royal genealogies, the son of Owain Ddantgwyn and grandson of Einion, son of Cunedda. He is associated with the southern Gwynedd region of Penllyn, and he was the ancestor of a later King of Gwynedd, Caradog ap Meirion. One of his brothers was Saint Seiriol.

Maelgwn (Maglocune), King of Gwynedd, receives the most sweeping condemnation and is described almost as a high king over the other kings (the power-giving dragon of the Apocalypse). The Isle of Anglesey was the base of power of the kings of Gwynedd, so describing Maelgwn as the 'dragon of the island' is appropriate. His pre-eminence over other kings is confirmed indirectly in other sources. For example, Maelgwn was a generous contributor to the cause of Christianity throughout Wales, implying a responsibility beyond the boundaries of his own kingdom. He made donations to support Saint Brynach in Dyfed, Saint Cadoc in Gwynllwg, Saint Cybi in Anglesey, Saint Padarn in Ceredigion, and Saint Tydecho in Powys. He is also associated with the foundation of Bangor.

=== Part III ===
The third part begins with the words, "Britain has priests, but they are fools; numerous ministers, but they are shameless; clerics, but they are wily plunderers." Gildas continues his jeremiad against the clergy of his age but does not explicitly mention any names in this section, and so does not cast any light on the history of the Church in this period.

== Legacy in the Anglo-Saxon period ==
Following the conquest of Britain described in De excidio, Gildas continued to provide an important model for Anglo-Saxon writers both in Latin and in English. Bede's Historia ecclesiastica gentis Anglorum relies heavily on Gildas for its account of the Anglo-Saxon invasions, and draws out the implications of Gildas's thesis of loss of divine favour by the Britons to suggest that this favour has, in turn, passed to the now Christianised Anglo-Saxons.

In the later Old English period, Gildas's writing provides a major model for Alcuin's treatment of the Viking invasions, in particular his letters relating to the sack of Lindisfarne in 793. The invocation of Gildas as a historical example serves to suggest the idea of moral and religious reform as a remedy for the invasions. Likewise, Wulfstan of York draws on Gildas to make a similar point in his sermons, particularly in the Sermo Lupi ad Anglos.

== Other historical implications ==
Gildas's work is important for reasons beyond the historical information he provides. At the time when Gildas was writing Britain was Christian. Gildas uses Latin to address the rulers he excoriates and regards Britons, at least to some degree, as Roman citizens, despite the collapse of central imperial authority. By 597, when St Augustine arrived in Kent, England, or at least most of it, was populated by adherents of Anglo-Saxon paganism, and the new rulers did not think of themselves as Roman citizens. Dating Gildas's work more exactly would hence provide a little more certainty about the timeline of the transition from post-Roman Britain to Anglo-Saxon England; a certainty that would be the more valuable as precise dates and reliable facts are extremely scarce for this period.

== Sources ==
- Giles, John Allen, ed. (1841), The Works of Gildas and Nennius, London: James Bohn — English translation
- Giles, John Allen, ed. (1854), History of the Ancient Britons, vol. II (Second ed.), Oxford: W. Baxter — in Latin
- Gransden, Antonia (1996). Historical Writing in England: c. 500 to c. 1307. Routledge. ISBN 9780415151245.
- Halsall, Guy (2013). Worlds of Arthur: Facts & Fictions of the Dark Ages. Oxford, UK: Oxford University Press. ISBN 978-0-19-870084-5.
- Koch, John T. (2006). Celtic Culture: A Historical Encyclopedia. ABC-CLIO. ISBN 9781851094400.
- Lloyd, John Edward (1912), A History of Wales from the Earliest Times to the Edwardian Conquest, vol. I (2nd ed.), London: Longmans, Green, and Co
- Miller, Molly. "Bede's use of Gildas." English Historical Review (1975): 241-261 in JSTOR.
