= Cuneglasus =

Prince of Rhos in Gwynedd, Wales

Cuneglasus (fl. 540) was a prince of Rhos in Gwynedd, Wales, in the late 5th or early 6th century. He was castigated for various sins by Gildas in De Excidio Britanniae. The Welsh form Cynlas Goch is attested in several genealogies of the Rhos royal line. The two names are assumed to refer to the same ruler.

== Cuneglasus and Gildas ==
Cuneglasus is one of the five "tyrants" of Britain denounced by Gildas in his c. early sixth century CE work On the Ruin of Britain. Gildas says of him:

- "You bear, you rider and ruler of many, and guider of the chariot which is the receptacle of the bear"; (Note: Latin: ...urse multorum sessor aurigaque currus receptaculi ursi...)
- "You contempter of God and vilifier of his order";
- "You tawny butcher, as in the Roman tongue thy name signifies"; (Note: Latin: ...Cuneglase Romana lingua lanio fulve...)
- one who raises war against men, indeed against his own countrymen, as well as against God;
- one who has "thrown out of doors your wife" and lustfully desires "her detestable sister who had vowed unto God, the everlasting chastity of widowhood".

The first phrase is notably obscure. The Latin receptāculum ("container; refuge") would literally describe a bear's lair or cage, which seems unlikely. Bartrum gives the translation as "driver of a chariot belonging to a bear's den". Those seeking an identification of Arthur with Cuneglasus's putative father Owain have seen it as reference to Cuneglasus's guiding the chariot containing his father's casket. In 1918, historian Arthur Wade-Evans theorized that the "bear's den" was actually the township of Dinerth in Rhos-on-Sea (Llandrillo yn Rhos). The name "Dinerth" can be translated to a "bear's fortress". Excavations undertaken in 1997 by David Longley for the Gwynedd Archaeological Trust revealed an early medieval fortress with a "massive, well-built" wall of quarried limestone standing 3 m (9.8 ft) high and fronted by a rampart of 3.5 metres (11 ft) of rubble. The phrase would then serve as a punning reference to the main court of Cuneglasus.

As for the final entry, Gildas does not mention the name of either of the two sisters, and their names do not survive in other sources.

== Welsh genealogies ==
According to Peter Bartrum (1907–2008), Cuneglasus is typically identified with a figure known in Welsh sources as Cynlas Goch, and there is little doubt about this identification. Cynlas appears in the genealogies of the kings of Rhos, in Gwynedd, as a son of Owain Danwyn and a father of Maig. The relationship is attested in the Harleian genealogies (HG), the Genealogies from Jesus College MS 20 (JC), and the Achau Brenhinoedd a Thywysogion Cymru (ABT). However the JC disagrees with the other sources on the exact relationship between the three men. Cynlas' cognomen, "Goch", is only mentioned in the ABT. This is also the only source which specifically connects him with Rhos.

The Bonedd y Saint, a genealogy of British saints, mentions other children of Owain Danwyn and apparent siblings of Cynlas. They included the saints Einion Frenin, Seiriol and Meirion, and in some versions, Hawystl Gloff. The Welsh genealogies also mention a brother of Owain Danwyn and paternal uncle to Cynlas: Cadwallon Lawhir ap Einion. Maelgwn is known as a son of Cadwallon, and consequently a paternal cousin of Cynlas.

Cynlas may have been the eponymous figure behind the ancient township of Cynlas, located in Llandderfel, Penllyn.

A grave of Cynlas is mentioned in a 1745 source, as located in Bangor Church, Caernarvonshire (Caernarfonshire).

== See also ==
- Family tree of Welsh monarchs
