= Glastening =

Old Welsh pedigree

Glastening (or Glastenning) was a Brittonic sub-kingdom of the sub-Roman and early medieval period, in what is currently Somerset, south-western Britain, between the 5th and 7th centuries, it is traditionally associated with Glas (possibly Glas ap Elno), a ruler of Dogfeiling, itself a sub-kingdom of Gwynedd, and also refers to a legendary Welsh pedigree mentioned by William of Malmesbury and that was associated with Glastonbury (Caerloyw) by folketymology. the precise extent and political status of Glastenning remains uncertain.

== Associated genealogies ==
Modern and medieval historians have sought to associate various versions of the same Old Welsh pedigree with Glastonbury. The earliest genealogy is a 10th-century text, the Harleian Genealogies, preserved in London, British Library, Harley MS 3859, which ends with Glast and states unum sunt Glastenic qui uenerunt que uocatur Loytcoyt, or "one of those, Glastenning, came from the place called Luit-Coyt" (modern Lichfield).

Other versions are given in the later Achau Brenhinoedd a Thywysogion Cymru and William of Malmesbury's De antiquitate Glastonie ecclesie, where the pedigree is listed as brothers. From the versions it not clear whether Glast was a personal name or a kindred group as Glastening, "descendants of Glasten", or an epithet Glas meaning "the Blue, Green or Grey".

The Glastenning pedigree is also connected with the Dogfeiling dynasty in Welsh genealogy. Elno ap Dogfael, of the line of Dogfeiling and descended from Cunedda, is recorded as the father of Glas ap Elno. The Welsh Classical Dictionary suggests that this Glas may be identical with Glast, the eponymous ancestor of the Glastenic kindred, This would connect the Glastenning genealogy with the wider Cunedda descended dynasties of northern Wales, though the connections of identity remains uncertain.

== In literature ==
The Glastening may be connected in some way to the Sumorsaete, an obscure Anglo-Saxon group who may have given their name to Somerset. According to William of Malmesbury, Glast was one of twelve brothers who migrated from the north to assume control of parts of Wales (the Britons still held much of the west of Britain) who were great-grandsons of Cunedda. He settled in Glastonbury with his livestock after finding it deserted. The 14th century codex from Oxford, Bodleian Library, Jesus College 20, actually gives Glas ap Elno (or Elnaw) as the great-grandson of Cunedda.

David Thornton finds "no strong evidence" for the association of the pedigree of the Glastening with Glastonbury other than the similarity of the names. He concludes that the Glastening had an association with Lichfield (problems of textual corruption making it difficult to be precise about the relationship) and that "their sojourn in Glastonbury, however, is the product of medieval pseudo-historical thought supported by the zealous ingenuity of subsequent scholars."

It is unclear when Glastonbury was first established, but it is first recorded in the 7th and the early 8th centuries, as Glestingaburg. The burg element is Anglo-Saxon and could refer either to a fortified place such as a burh or, more likely, a monastic enclosure. However the Glestinga element is obscure, and may derive from an Old English word or from a Saxon or Celtic personal name.

== See also ==
- Wikisource: Harleian MS 3859 Genealogies
