= Meleri =

Welsh queen and saint

Saint Meleri

Queen of Ceredigion
- Born: mid-5th century
- Died: late 5th century
- Venerated in: Catholic Church

Saint Meleri was a late 5th century Welsh saint and Queen of Ceredigion.

Meleri was one of the 24 daughters of King Brychan Brycheiniog of Brycheiniog (now Brecknockshire) in Wales.

She married King Ceredig of Ceredigion, one of the son of Cunedda Wledig and was the mother and grandmother of several children who later became saints, including Saint David.

Although there are no churches dedicated to her, the influence of Meleri in introducing Christianity to Ceredigion cannot be underestimated as the saints active there were almost all her children, grandchildren or great grandchildren.
