= Padarn Beisrudd =

Welsh genealogical figure

Padarn Beisrudd ap Tegid (Welsh pronunciation: [ˈpadarn ˈbai̯srɨːð ap 'tegid]), was the son of a man named Tegid ap Iago, who may have been born with the Roman name of Tacitus. Padarn is believed to have been born in the early 4th century in the Old North (or Hen Ogledd) of Roman Britain. According to Old Welsh tradition, his grandson, King Cunedda, came from Manaw Gododdin, the modern Clackmannanshire region of Scotland.

One speculative interpretation identifies Padarn as a Romano-British official of reasonably high rank who was placed in command of the Iron Age Votadini troops stationed in Clackmannanshire in the 380s or earlier by Roman Emperor Magnus Maximus. Alternatively, he may have been a frontier chieftain in the same region who was granted Roman military rank, a practice attested elsewhere along the empire's borders at the time. It is possible that Padarn ruled as an independent tribal king.

The Votadini tribes seemed to have maintained friendly relations with the Romans since the second century A.D. at least. After the reorganisation following the Great Conspiracy of 367-369 along Hadrian's Wall, the tribal chief at the time was probably recognized as an independent king, with an army of his own, responsible for holding part of what is now Northern Scotland.

This period would fit in with the date of Padarn Beisrudd's reign, which probably lasted until his death, and was then assumed by his son Edern (Edeyrn=Eternus). Edern was the father of Cunedda, founder of the Kingdom of Gwynedd, and member of the House of Gwynedd.

The coat of Padarn is one of the Thirteen Treasures of the Island of Britain. The coat is said to perfectly fit any well-born nobleman, but not a churl. The Life of Saint Padarn confuses this Padarn with the saint, and contains a story about how King Arthur tried to steal his tunic and became a Christian afterward.
