= Einion Yrth ap Cunedda =

King of Gwynedd from c. 470 to c. 480

Einion Yrth ap Cunedda (c. 440 – c. 500; reigned c. 470 – c. 480), also known as Einion Yrth (Welsh for "the Impetuous"), was a king of Gwynedd. He is claimed as an ancestor of the later rulers of North Wales.

One of the sons of Cunedda, he travelled with his father to North Wales in the early 450s to expel Irish raiders from the region. After his father's death, Einion inherited control over the newly founded kingdom of Gwynedd. Aided by his brother Ceredig, ruler of Ceredigion, and his nephew Meirion, ruler of Meirionnydd, Einion built upon his father's successes and further established his family's rule in the region. He was succeeded by two sons: Cadwallon Lawhir and Owain Danwyn.

== See also ==
- Family tree of Welsh monarchs

Preceded by Cunedda	King of Gwynedd c. 470 – c. 480	Succeeded by Owain Danwyn
