= Saint Ina =

Saint Ina is thought to be a fifth century Welsh saint and a member of the royal house of Gwynedd.

Ina was the daughter of Ceredig ab Cunedda Wledig (c. 420–453), and a granddaughter of Cunedda Wledig, the progenitor of the royal dynasty of Gwynedd. The church of St Ina in Llanina in Ceredigion is dedicated to her. There is a tradition that the dedicatee is the Anglo-Saxon King Ine (or Ina) of Wessex (died 727), but this is not true.

St Ina Road in Heath, Cardiff is presumably named after this Saint Ina, as it is among a group of roads named after Celtic saints.

== Sources ==
- Baring-Gould, Sabine; Fisher, John (1911). Lives of the British Saints. Honourable Society of Cymmrodorion. p. 318.
