= Sumorsaete =

Anglo-Saxon group

The Sumorsaete were an Anglo-Saxon group living in what is now Somerset, presumably around the town of Somerton. They are evidently the source of the county's name. The group may have been established as early as 577, when the Saxons conquered part of the area from the Britons, but they are not mentioned by name until 845. They may have been related to the obscure Glastening or Glestinga, who may be the source of the name Glastonbury.

== Name ==
The name Sumorsǣte is Old English and may be a shortened form of Sumortūnsǣte, meaning "the people living at or dependent upon Sumortūn", i.e. the modern town of Somerton. The origin of Somerton itself is unknown; it may mean 'The sea-lake enclosure' from the Old English sae, mere and tun or possibly "summer farmstead", from sumer and -tūn. The first known use of the name Somersæte was in 845, after the region fell to the Saxons. When King Alfred coined the future county motto 'Sumorsǣte ealle' in the ninth century, he referred to the people of Somerset as the Sumortūnsǣte.

== History ==
The Sumorsaete may have been related in some way to the obscure Glastening or Glestinga, about whom almost nothing is known, but whose name has been connected to nearby Glastonbury. One of the Harleian genealogies dating to the 10th century begins with a certain "Glast", who came to "Glastening" from Luit-Coyt (modern Lichfield in England). This pedigree also appears in later versions, though it is unclear if these version intend a person named "Glas" or a kindred group.

The native Britons of the Southwest at this time spoke a variant of the Common Brittonic language ancestral to Cornish. Anglo-Saxon settlers introduced Old English. The Anglo-Saxons established control over much of what is now England by 600, but were held off at British-held Somerset. However, by the early 8th century King Ine of Wessex had pushed the boundaries of the West Saxon kingdom far enough west to include Somerset. The Saxon royal palace in Cheddar was used several times in the 10th century to host the Witenagemot.

The earliest fortification of Taunton started for King Ine of Wessex and Æthelburg, in or about the year 710 AD. However, according to the Anglo-Saxon Chronicle this was destroyed 12 years later. Somerset, like Dorset to the south, held the West Saxon advance from Wiltshire/Hampshire back for over a century, remaining a frontier between the Saxons and the Romano-British Celts. The Saxons conquered Bath following the Battle of Deorham in 577, and the border was probably established along the line of the Wansdyke to the north of the Mendip Hills. Then Cenwalh of Wessex broke through at Bradford-on-Avon in 652, and the Battle of Peonnum possibly at Penselwood in 658, advancing west through the Polden Hills to the River Parrett.

== See also ==
- Battle of Deorham
- Battle of Mount Badon
