= Ceredig =

King of Ceredigion (died 453)

Ceredig ap Cunedda
- Ruler, Kingdom of Ceredigion
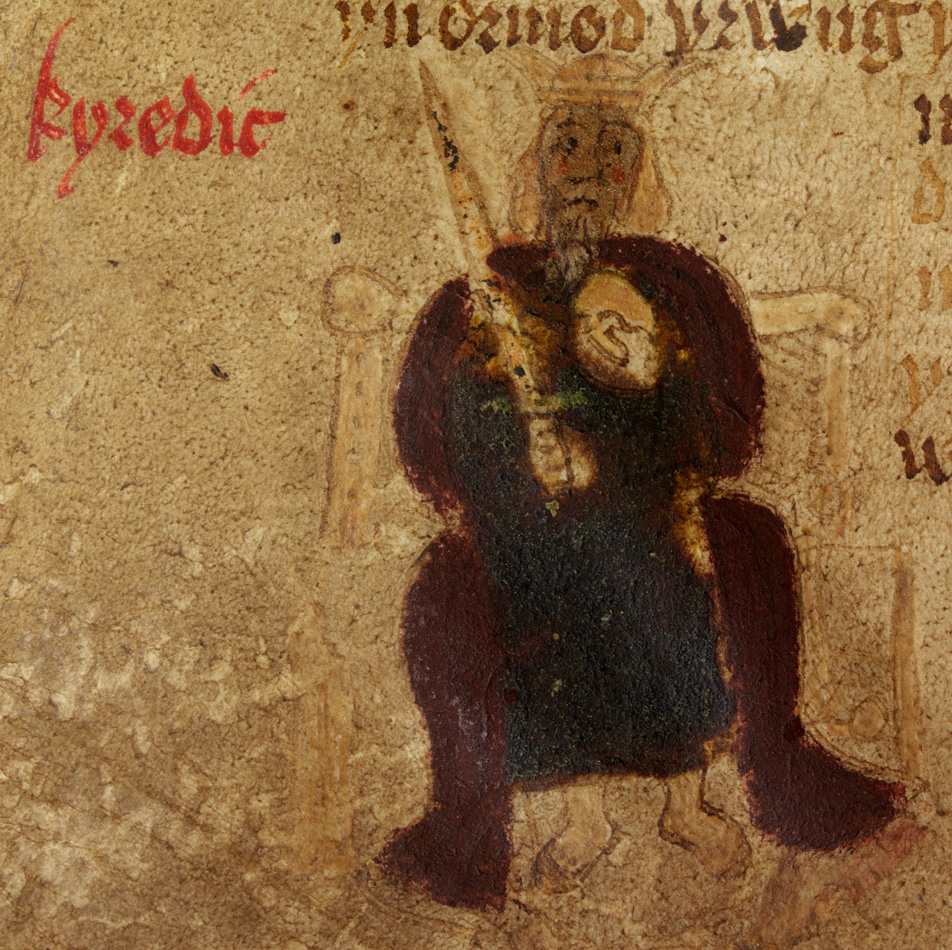
- Born: c. 420 AD
- Died: 453 AD
- Father: Cunedda

Ceredig ap Cunedda (died 453) is a probably legendary king of Ceredigion in Wales, first mentioned in the 11th century.

He is said to have been born c. 420 in the Brythonic kingdom of Manaw Gododdin (modern Lothian in Scotland), centred on the Firth of Forth in the area known as Yr Hen Ogledd. Little is known of him. One of the sons of Cunedda, grandfather of Saint David, according to Nennius' Historia Brittonum, he arrived in what is now modern Wales from Gododdin with his father's family when they were invited to help ward off Irish invaders. As a reward for his bravery, his father gave him the southernmost part of the territories in north-west Wales reconquered from the Irish. The realm is traditionally supposed to have been called Ceredigion after him, which led to the name of modern Ceredigion, one of the principal areas of Wales.

He married Meleri, one of the many daughters of King Brychan Brycheiniog of Brycheiniog (now Brecknockshire). Amongst their children was a daughter named Ina who is thought to be the Saint Ina to whom St Ina's Church in Llanina near New Quay, Ceredigion is dedicated, and a son named Sanctus who in legend raped Saint Non and is the father of Saint David.
