= Seiriol =

Saint Seiriol
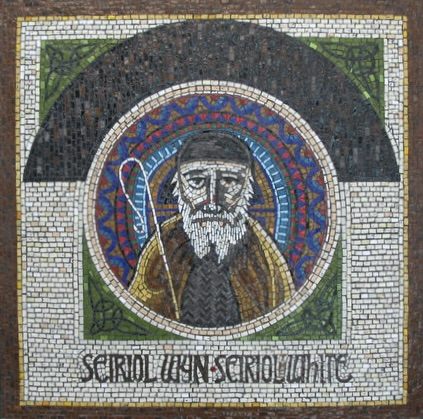
- Born: North Wales
- Died: Ynys Seiriol (Anglesey)
- Venerated in: Eastern Orthodox Church; Anglican Communion; Roman Catholic Church
- Feast: 1 February

Seiriol (/ˈsaɪriɒl/, Welsh pronunciation: [ˈsɛirjɔl]) was an early 6th-century saint, who created a cell at Penmon Priory on Anglesey, off the coast of north Wales. He later moved to Ynys Seiriol (Puffin Island).

== Narrative ==
Seiriol was a son of King Owain Danwyn of Rhos, and younger brother of King Cynlas of Rhos and King Einion of Llŷn. His cell at Penmon is said to have been rebuilt by his brothers, as they didn't think his humble residence was good enough. St Seiriol's Well (Ffynnon Seiriol) lies in a small chamber adjoining its remains. Both are protected by Cadw, the publicly funded body responsible for the historic monuments of Wales. Adjacent to them are the church and ruins of a monastery also dating back to Seiriol's day.

According to legend, Seiriol and Saint Cybi were good friends, and would meet weekly near Llanerchymedd, at the Clorach wells. Saint Cybi would walk from Holyhead, facing the rising sun in the morning and setting sun in the evening. Saint Cybi was known as Cybi Felyn (Cybi the Tanned), as he was tanned during his journey. Seiriol, travelling in the opposite direction, from Penmon, would have his back to the sun.Thus, he was known as Seiriol Wyn (Seiriol the Fair). Rhyd-y-Saint railway station (English: Ford of the Saints railway station) on the Red Wharf Bay branch line near Pentraeth was named so, since Seiriol and Cybi are said to have met there.

St Seiriol's Well is a small rectangular pool set in a well chamber to the north of Penmon Priory church.

In his old age, Seiriol retired to Ynys Lannog which subsequently became known (in Welsh) as Ynys Seiriol. Later it would be known to the Vikings as Prestholmr (Priestholm), and is known as Puffin Island in English since the 19th century.

== Veneration ==
Saint Seiriol is commemorated 1 February in both the Catholic and Eastern Orthodox Churches. The Russian Orthodox Diocese of Sourozh of Great Britain and Ireland (Moscow Patriarchate) holds an annual pilgrimage to the Holy Well of St. Seiriol in Penmon, most recently on July 23, 2022.

Trams on the Great Orme Tramway are named after local saints, #6 being Seiriol. The Liverpool and North Wales Steamship Company steamer St Seiriol ran excursions to the Isle of Man. It served as an Auxiliary minesweeper during WWI.

St Seiriol is depicted in a Venetian Glass mosaic by Gary Drostle at the western end of The Celtic Gateway footbridge in Holyhead.

== Sources ==
- Seiriol on National Library of Wales Dictionary of Welsh Biography
