= Dogfeiling =

Welsh medieval sub-kingdom and commote

Coordinates: 52.699°N 3.256°W

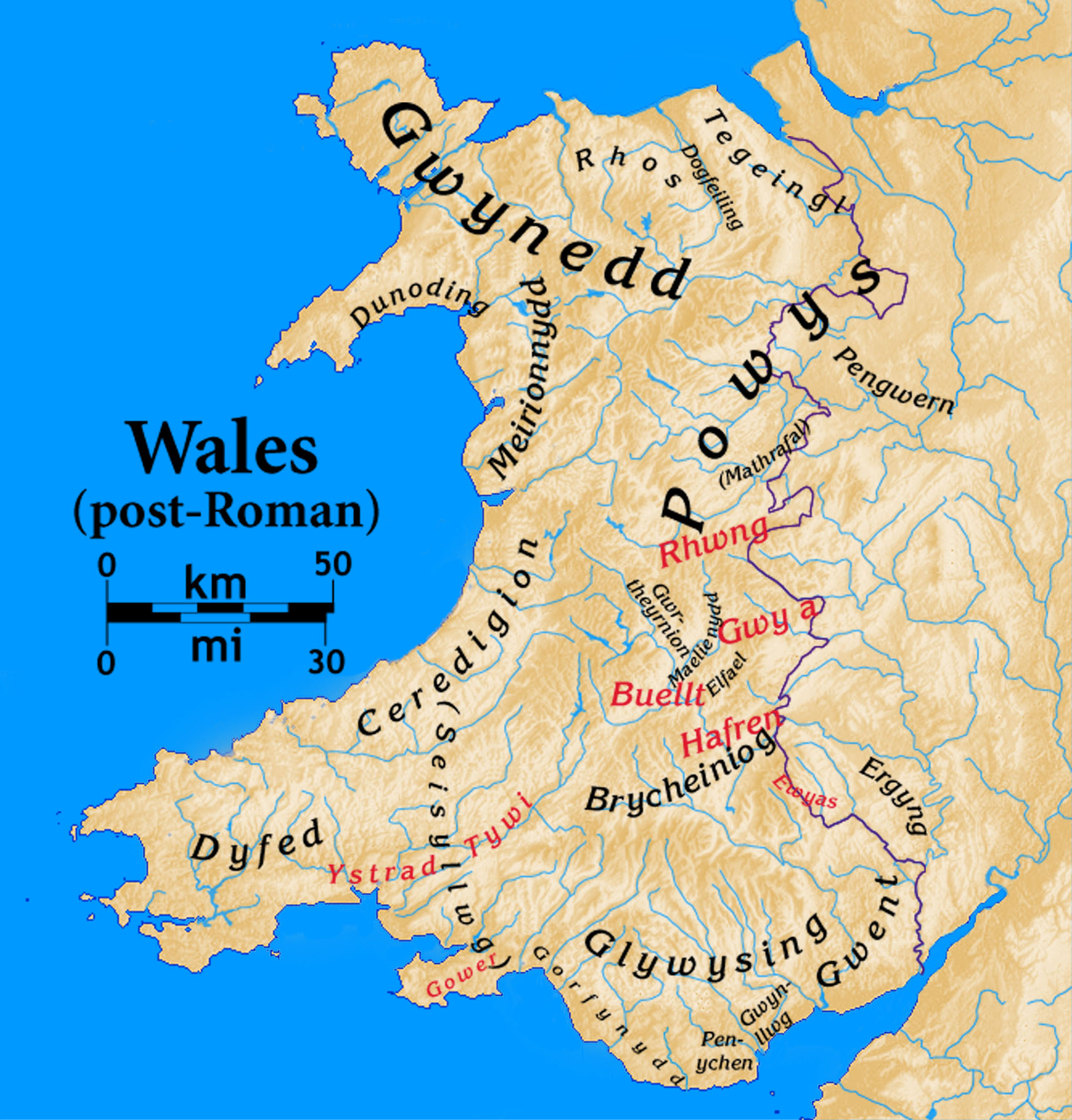
Post-Roman Welsh kingdoms. Dogfeiling is in the north center, between Rhos and Tegeingl. The modern Anglo-Welsh border is also shown.

Dogfeiling was a minor sub-kingdom and later a commote in north Wales.

It formed part of the eastern border of the Kingdom of Gwynedd in early medieval Wales. It existed from 445 until sometime around the year 700 when it was re-absorbed back into Gwynedd proper.

The area was named after Dogfael, who was the son of Gwynedd's first king, Cunedda Wledig.
