= Rhos (North Wales) =

Welsh post-Roman kingdom, later a cantref

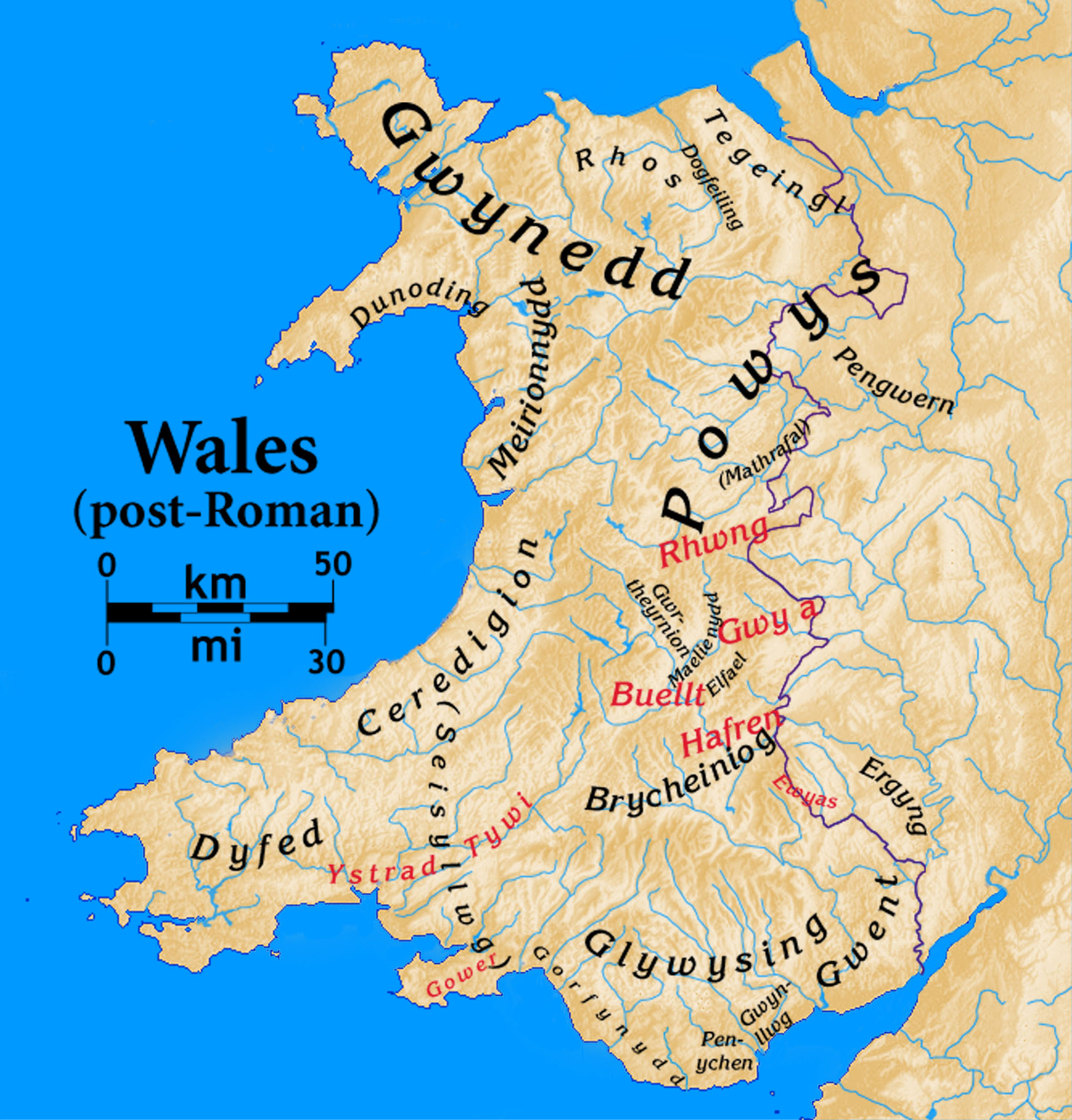
Post-Roman Welsh kingdoms, Rhos is in the center north, near the coast. The modern Anglo-Welsh border is also shown.

Rhos (Welsh for 'moor' / 'moorland') is a region to the east of the River Conwy in North Wales. It started as a minor kingdom then became a medieval cantref, and was usually part of the Kingdom of Gwynedd (later the region became part of Denbighshire, then Clwyd, and is now in Conwy county borough).

== Kingdom: history and archaeology ==
Rhos is identified as a small kingdom during the sub-Roman and early medieval periods in an Old Welsh genealogical document "Ancestry of the Kings and Princes of Wales" listing thirteen of its kings (including two who are known to have ruled the wider region of Gwynedd).

The most famous monarch was perhaps Cuneglasus (Cynlas, son of Owain Danwyn), who lived in the early 6th century and was denounced by the monk, Gildas. He wrote (in Latin) that Cuneglasus was the "guider of the chariot which is the receptacle of the bear". The latter may refer to a "Fort of the Bear", possibly Dinerth, the name of a hillfort on Bryn Euryn in Llandrillo yn Rhos. The road that runs below the western side of the hill is still called Dinerth Road and Dinerth Hall is nearby.

The Gwynedd Archaeological Trust has undertaken a trial excavation of this hillfort and set up related information boards in Colwyn Bay Library. Their investigations revealed a massive defensive stone wall, well built and faced with good-quality limestone blocks originally rising to about ten feet high. The ramparts were eleven and a half feet thick. These defences are unlike those of Iron Age hillforts but comparable with similar Medieval fortifications, so may represent a possible stronghold of the Kings of Rhos.

== Administrative unit ==
By the 11th century, Rhos was part of Gwynedd Is Conwy (Gwynedd "below", east in this case, the River Conwy) as an administrative unit known as a cantref. Along with its three adjoining cantrefi, the area was known as Y Berfeddwlad or the "Middle Country" lying between Gwynedd and Powys and often changing hands between those two powerful kingdoms. With the loss of Welsh independence in 1283, Rhos became part of the lordship of Denbigh, as granted to the English Earl of Lincoln. The cantrefi were abolished in 1536 with the creation of Denbighshire, but the name of Rhos survives today in places such as Llandrillo-yn-Rhos (Rhos-on-Sea) and Betws-yn-Rhos (with "yn Rhos" meaning "in Rhos.")

== Commotes ==
Creuddyn was a historic commote of Rhos, then later of Caernarfonshire.

== See also ==
- Roose Hundred
