= Cadwallon Lawhir =

King of Gwynedd from c. 500 to c. 534

Cadwallon Lawhir ap Einion (c. 460 – c. 534), usually known as Cadwallon Lawhir ("Long Hand") and also called Cadwallon I by some historians, was a king of Gwynedd around 500.

Cadwallon was the son of Einion Yrth ap Cunedda and Prawst ferch Deithlyn. He is often considered to have been king of Gwynedd from his father's death in about 500 until his own death in 534.

He is credited with having driven the last Irish settlers off the island of Anglesey. According to one tradition, Cadwallon and his army padlocked their own feet to their stirrups so that they could not be tempted to flee the battle. Cadwallon's opponent, the leader of the Irish of Angelsey, was said to be Serigi Wyddel (Serigi "The Irishman"), and the final battle was fought at either Cerrig y Gwyddyl or Llan y Gwyddyl near Holyhead.

Cadwallon's epithet, Lawhir, may possibly refer to him having longer than usual arms or might also be a metaphor, referring to the extent of his authority. The late medieval poet Iolo Goch claims that he could "reach a stone from the ground to kill a raven, without bending his back, because his arm was as long as his side to the ground."

According to Gildas, Cadwallon's son, Maelgwn, murdered his uncle in order to ascend the throne.

== Caswallon's Llys ==
There has been a longstanding association, in antiquarian writings, between Cadwallon and a possible Llys (medieval royal court building) known as Caswallon's Llys. This was indicated on the Ordnance Survey map of 1889 as within a field near Mynydd Eilian, in the Llaneilian community, in the north-east corner of the Isle of Anglesey. With no obvious remains by the 20th century, it had been largely discredited as a Llys site until a geophysical survey in 2009 identified foundations of a rectangular building within a trapezoidal enclosure, for which an early medieval site was a strong possibility.

== See also ==
- Family tree of Welsh monarchs
- Bodysgallen Hall

Preceded by Einion Yrth ap Cunedda	King of Gwynedd c. 500 – c. 534	Succeeded by Maelgwn Gwynedd
