= Meirion =

Meirion is a Welsh given name and surname. It derives from the Latin name Marianus, which itself is a derivative of Marius.

== Given name ==
- Meirion Jones, Welsh journalist
- Meirion Pennar (1944–2010), Welsh poet and academic
- Meirion Roberts (1934–2025), Welsh rugby union player
- Meirion Thomas (1894–1977), Welsh botanist and plant physiologist
- Meirion Williams (1901–1976), Welsh songwriter

== Surname ==
- Rhys Meirion (born 1966), Welsh singer

== See also ==
- Marion (given name)
- Marion (surname)
