= Cunedda =

Ancestor figure of the First Dynasty of Gwynedd

Cunedda ab Edern
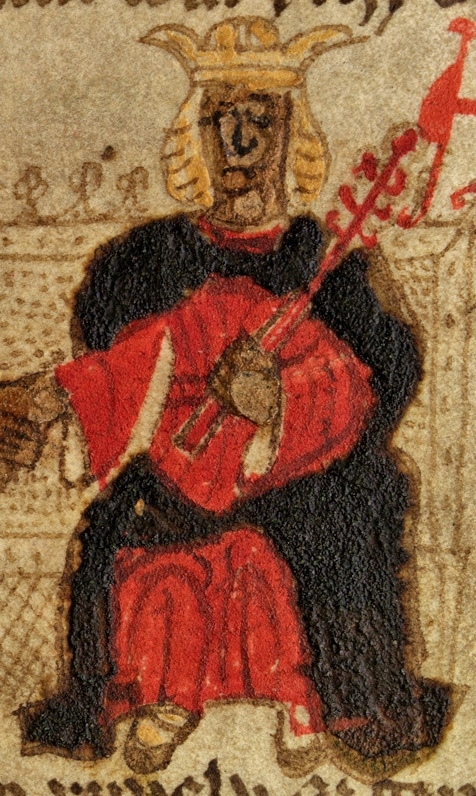
- 15th century illustration of Cunedda from an edition of Brut y Brenhinedd
- Spouse: Gwawl ferch Coel
- Issue: Einion Yrth ap Cunedda
- Dynasty: First Dynasty of Gwynedd
- Father: Edern ap Padarn

Cunedda ab Edern or Cunedda Wledig was the alleged founder of the First Dynasty of Gwynedd.

== Name ==
The name Cunedda (spelled Cunedag in the AD 828 pseudo-history Historia Brittonum) derives from the Brythonic word *Cuno-dagos, meaning "Good Hound/Warrior" or "Having Good Hounds/Warriors". His title, Wledig, is an obscure and difficult to translate epithet. It literally means, "of a gwlad" or "country". However, as an epithet, Wledig was possibly applied to some official or claimed position within the Roman hierarchy. It has been argued that the term is likely a rendition of a Roman title since all known figures with the title are either genealogically connected with the Roman aristocracy or associated with the Roman government.

These figures also all ruled in the century after the Roman withdrawal from Britain. However, this interpretation is subject to criticism. The historian Rachel Bromwich argued that translating Latin titles into Welsh is unusual for contemporary Welsh leaders, who typically used the original Latin titles. There are other competing theories concerning the true meaning of the term. The word Gwledig is a cognate with the Irish word flaith, which means ruler. Therefore, the word may simply mean "lord" or "ruler".

== Early life ==
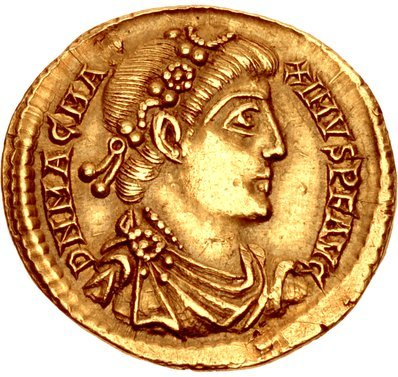
Coin featuring Magnus Maximus, Roman Emperor

Cunedda's family is traced back to a grandfather living in late Roman Britain named Padarn Beisrudd. His name literally translates as Paternus of the "red tunic" or the scarlet cloak, a colour attributed to Roman officers during the Roman Empire. One traditional interpretation identifies Padarn as a Roman (Romano-British) official of reasonably high rank who had been placed in command of the Votadini troops stationed in the Clackmannanshire region of Scotland in the 380s or earlier by the Roman Emperor Magnus Maximus.

Alternatively, he may have been a frontier chieftain who was granted Roman military rank, a practice attested elsewhere along the empire's borders at the time. Possibly, Padarn's command in Scotland was assumed after his death by his son, Edern (Latin: Æturnus), and then passed to Edern's son, Cunedda, who would later be the founder of the Kingdom of Gwynedd and become its first King.

=== Genealogy ===
Cunedda's genealogy, as many early Welsh Royal families, was later said to descend from Afallach, son of Beli Mawr, the legendary father of King Cassivellaunus. Cassivellaunus was a pre-Roman historical figure who fought against Julius Caesar during his invasion of Britain in 54 BC.

Coel Hen, possibly based on a historical figure from post-Roman Britain, was said to be Cunedda's father-in-law and also to be a descendant of Beli Mawr. As head of the House of Gwynedd, Cunedda's line was claimed to continue through to Rhodri Mawr, and the subsequent houses of Aberffraw, Dinefwr, and Mathrafal.

== Life ==
=== Move to Gwynedd ===
According to Old Welsh tradition contained in section 62 of the Historia Brittonum, Cunedda came from Manaw Gododdin, the modern Falkirk region of Scotland:

Maelgwn, the great king, was reigning among the Britons in the region of Gwynedd, for his ancestor, Cunedag, with his sons, whose number was eight, had come previously from the northern part, that is from the region which is called Manaw Gododdin, one hundred and forty-six years before Maelgwn reigned. And with great slaughter, they drove out from those regions the Scotti who never returned again to inhabit them.

Cunedda and his forebears led the Votadini against Pictish and Irish incursions south of Hadrian's Wall. Sometime after this, the Votadini troops under Cunedda relocated to North Wales to defend the region from Irish invasion, specifically the Uí Liatháin, as mentioned in the Historia Brittonum. Cunedda established himself in Wales, in the territory of the Venedoti, which would become the centre of the Kingdom of Gwynedd. Two explanations for these actions have been suggested: either Cunedda was acting under the orders of Magnus Maximus (or Maximus' successors) or Vortigern, the high king of the British in the immediate post-Roman era. The range of dates (suggested by Oxford genealogist Peter Bartrum) runs from the late 370s, which would favour Maximus, to the late 440s, which would favour Vortigern.

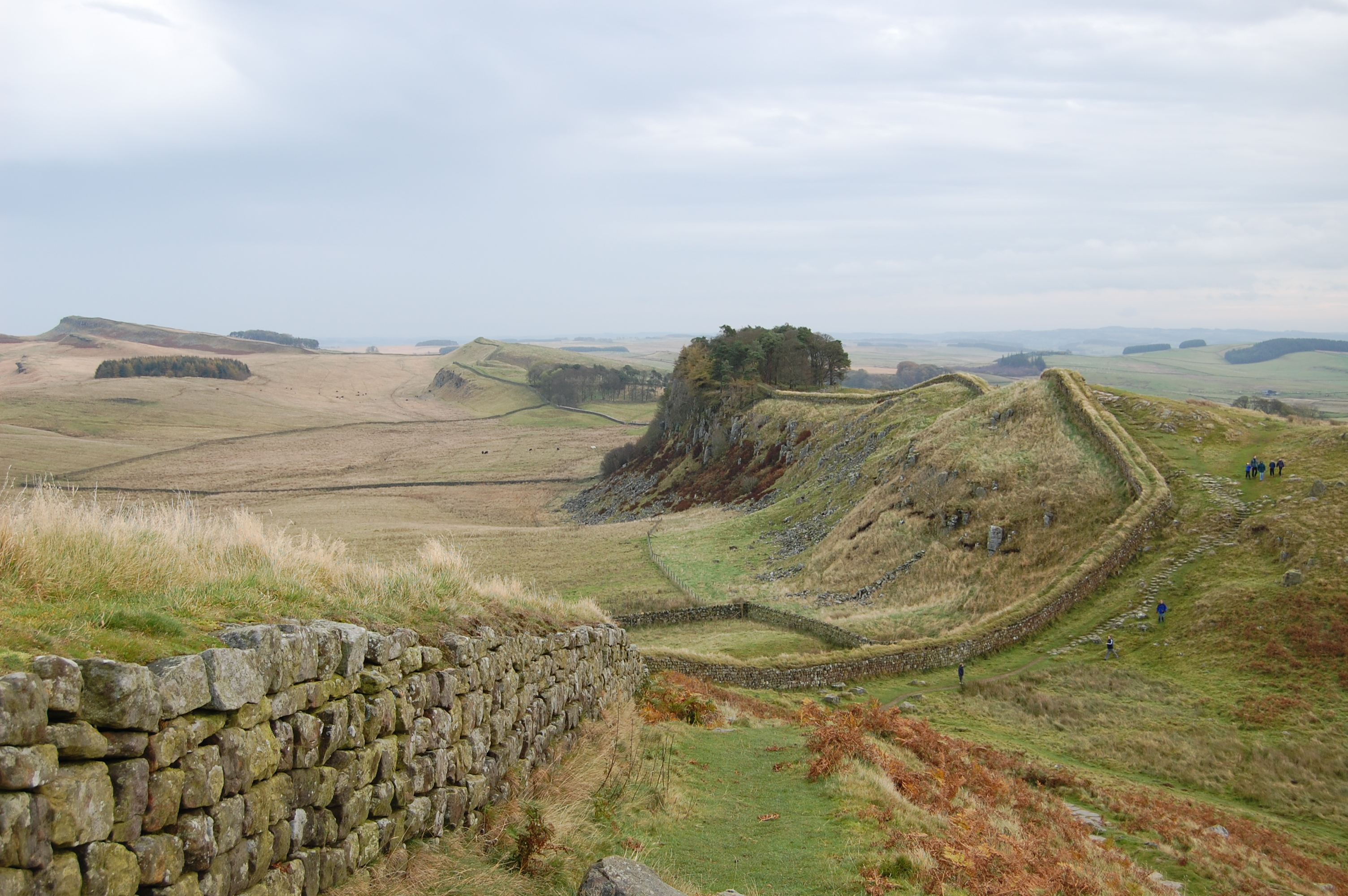
The Roman Hadrian's Wall, Cunedda and his family commanded the Votadini between its wall and Antonine Wall, located at the edge of England and Scotland.

The suggestion that Cunedda was operating under instructions from Rome has been challenged by several historians. David Dumville dismisses the whole concept of transplanting foederati from Scotland to Wales in this manner, given that the political state of sub-Roman Britain would probably have made it impossible to exercise such centralised control by the 5th century. As Maximus himself was dead by the end of 388, and Constantine III departed from Britain with the last of Rome's military forces in 407, less than a generation later, it is doubtful that Rome had much direct influence over the military actions of the Votadini, either through Maximus or any other emissary, for any significant length of time.

Magnus Maximus (or his successors) may have handed over control of the British frontiers to local chieftains at an earlier date; with the evacuation of the fort at Chester (which Mike Ashley, incidentally, argues is most likely where Cunedda established his initial base in the region, some years later) in the 370s, he may have had little option. Given that the archaeological record demonstrates Irish settlement on the Llŷn Peninsula however and possible raids as far west as Wroxeter by the late 4th century, it is difficult to conceive of either Roman or allied British forces having presented an effective defence in Wales.

Academics such as Sheppard Frere have argued that it may have been Vortigern who, adopting elements of Roman statecraft, moved the Votadini south, just as he invited Saxon settlers to protect other parts of the island. According to this version of events, Vortigern would have instructed Cunedda and his Votadini subjects to move to Wales in response to the aforementioned Irish incursions no later than the year 442, when Vortigern's former Saxon allies rebelled against his rule. Some historians even suggest that Cunedda never even moved to North Wales and simply died while fighting the Picts, and Nennius's claims about Cunedda are just simply propaganda for the Kingdom of Gwynedd. Based on the fact that despite Nennius saying Cunedda "drove out the Irish with great slaughter and that they never returned" it is not entirely true as there was heavy Irish presence among the southern Welsh Kingdoms and Anglesey even in the 6th century.

=== Life and succession ===
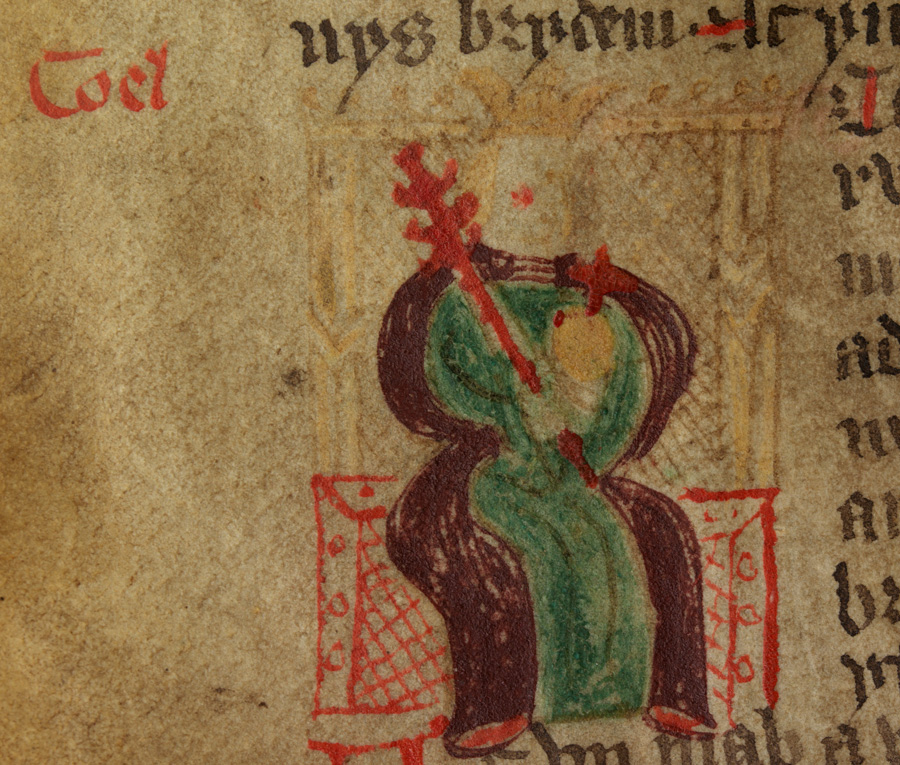
King Coel Hen, father-in-law of Cunedda

Of Cunedda personally even less is known. Probably celebrated for his strength, courage, and ability to rally the beleaguered Romano-British forces of the region, he eventually secured a politically advantageous marriage to Gwawl, daughter of King Coel Hen, the Romano-British ruler of Eboracum (modern York) appointed by Magnus Maximus, and is claimed to have had nine sons. The early kingdoms of Ceredigion and Meirionnydd were supposedly named after his two sons King Ceredig and King Meirion.

Cunedda's supposed great-grandson Maelgwn Gwynedd was a contemporary of Gildas, and according to the Annales Cambriae died in 547. The reliability of early Welsh genealogies is not uncontested however, and many of the claims regarding the number and identity of Cunedda's heirs did not surface until as late as the 10th century. Nonetheless, if we accept this information as valid, calculating back from this date suggests the mid-5th century interpretation.

== Allt Cunedda ==
There is a hill called Allt Cunedda, close to Cydweli (now Kidwelly) in Carmarthenshire, in southwest Wales. A local folk story, recorded by Victorian antiquarians, claims that Cunedda and his sons attempted to invade Cydweli, but was defeated and killed by rebellious locals and was buried in the Allt Cunedda. Amateur and ill-recorded excavations did reveal a hill fort, probably pre-Roman, the broken head of a stone hammer axe, and several collapsed stone cists containing the well-preserved skeletons of several men with formidable physical proportions. At least one of these was found in the "seated position" and another buried beneath a massive stone "shield" who had apparently been killed by a head wound. John Fenton's excavations in 1851 destroyed much of the archaeological evidence from Allt Cunedda, and more by John William Watson Stephens' dig in the 1930s. The bones are lost; Fenton sent them to an institution in London, and Stephens' long searches for them were unsuccessful.

One of the tumuli was known locally as Banc Benisel and was reputedly the grave of a Sawyl Penuchel, a legendary King of the Britons presumably from late Iron Age Britain. His epithet Penuchel or Ben Uchel means "high head" perhaps on account of his height. According to the Welsh Life of Saint Cadoc, a king named Sawyl Penuchel held court at Allt Cunedda. Confusingly, Geoffrey of Monmouth, in his Historia Regum Britanniae (1136), uses the name Samuil Penessil for a legendary pre-Roman king of Britain, preceded by Redechius and succeeded by Pir. Whether this is the same king and Cadoc's tale is just revisiting an old folk memory, a different man of the same name, or simply an error by the composer of the Life, is unclear.

== Marwnad Cunedda ==
The "Marwnad Cunedda", or "Lament for Cunedda", is a Welsh poem found in the Book of Taliesin. "The poem laments the death of a representative of the house of Cunedda who has been killed in a fratricidal war with his kinsmen of the clan of Coel Godebawc". Ostensibly, the subject is Cunedda himself.

This poem has been called "perhaps the earliest specimen of Welsh poetry extant." However, the exact age is disputed. There is a gap of approximately 150 years between the death of Cunedda and the lifetime of Taliesin. One proposed explanation for the discrepancy is that the Lament was not composed on Cunedda's death, but instead was intended to praise Cunedda's descendants, the rulers of Gwynedd. The current text itself dates from the sixteenth century, and is somewhat obscure. There are a number of translations, differing in some details.

== Immediate family ==
The Welsh Dragon on the Flag of Wales, associated with King Cadwaladr, descendant of Cunedda

=== Immediate ancestors ===
- Eternus (Edeyrn) father, Commander of the Votadini troops;
- Paternus (Padarn Beisrudd, of the red robe) grandfather, Commander of the Votadini troops;
- Tacitus (Tegid) great-grandfather.

=== Children ===
- Rhufon, ruler of the Kingdom of Rhufoniog;
- Dunod, ruler of the Kingdom of Dunoding;
- Ceredig, King of the Kingdom of Ceredigion, grandfather of Bishop Saint David;
- Einion, Ruler of Gwynedd, father of King Cadwallon Lawhir ap Einion;
- Dogfael, King of the petty Kingdom of Dogfeiling;
- Edern, ruler of the minor Kingdom of Edeirnion under Gwynedd;
- Gwen, the wife of Amlawdd Wledig;
- As well as Tybion, Ysfael and Afloeg.

=== Great-grandson ===
Maelgwn Gwynedd, King of Gwynedd, referred by Gildas as Maelgwn the Dragon or Dragon of the Island, and was the ancestor of King Cadwaladr.

The Red Dragon would later be flown by the House of Tudor, claimed descendants of Cunedda, through Owen Tudor and King Henry Tudor, and is featured on the Flag of Wales.

== See also ==
- Family tree of Welsh monarchs

== Sources ==
- Bartrum, Peter; A Welsh Classical Dictionary, National Library of Wales, 1993, pp. 172–173.
- J. Fenton; "The Grave of Sawyl Benisel, King of the Britons", Archaeol. Camb., vol. 2 (1851), new series, pp. 159–162.
- Lloyd, John Edward (1912), A History of Wales from the Earliest Times to the Edwardian Conquest, vol. I (2nd ed.), London: Longmans, Green, and Co.
- Giles, John Allen, ed. (1841), The Works of Gildas and Nennius, London: James Bohn — English translation.
- Giles, John Allen, ed. (1854), History of the Ancient Britons, vol. II (Second ed.), Oxford: W. Baxter — in Latin.
- Phillimore, Egerton (1888), "The Annales Cambriae and Old Welsh Genealogies, from Harleian MS. 3859", Y Cymmrodor, vol. IX, Honourable Society of Cymmrodorion, pp. 141–183

New title Created; Kingdom of Gwynedd	King of Gwynedd c. 450 - c. 460	Succeeded by Einion Yrth ap Cunedda
