= Cyngen ap Cadell =

King of Powys
- Reign: 808–854
- Predecessor: Cadell
- Successor: Rhodri Mawr
- Born: c. 790 AD
- Died: 854 (aged 63–64); Rome, Italy
- Issue: Gruffydd; Elisedd; Ieuaf; Aeddan
- House: Gwertherion
- Father: Cadell

Cyngen ap Cadell (also spelled Concenn) was King of Powys from 808 until his death in 854 during a pilgrimage to Rome.

== Biography ==
Cyngen was of the line of Brochwel Ysgithrog, and, after a long reign as king of Powys, he went on a pilgrimage to Rome and died there in 854. He is thought to be the first Welsh ruler to visit Rome after the healing of the breach between the Welsh branch of the Celtic Church and Rome over the date of Easter.

Cyngen raised a pillar, originally a round-shafted cross, in memory of his great-grandfather Elisedd ap Gwylog which stands near the later abbey of Valle Crucis. This memorial had a lengthy inscription and is known as the Pillar of Eliseg owing to a typographical mistake by the original carver.

Cyngen was the last of the original line of kings of Powys of the Gwertherion dynasty. He had three sons, but on his death Powys was annexed by Rhodri Mawr, ruler of Gwynedd. Rhodri was his nephew, as Rhodri's father Merfyn Frych had married his sister, Nest ferch Cadell.

Although, certain later manuscript pedigrees (like Jesus College 20) claim that Rhodri was the son of Cyngen's sister, Nest ferch Cadell, others (like Mostyn 117) claim he was the son of Essyllt ferch Cynan (thought to be the daughter of Cynan Dindaethwy, of Gwynedd). In any case, traditional Welsh law does not seem to allow female inheritance, so Rhodri is presumed to have taken Powys by conquest.

Cyngen had the following children:

- Elisedd ap Cyngen;
- Ieuaf ap Cyngen;
- Aeddan ap Cyngen;
- Gruffydd ap Cyngen.

== See also ==
- Family tree of Welsh monarchs

== Sources ==
- John Edward Lloyd (1911). A history of Wales: from the earliest times to the Edwardian conquest. Longmans, Green & Co.

Preceded by Cadell ap Brochfael	King of Powys; 808–854	Succeeded by Rhodri Mawr
