= Idwal Iwrch =

King of Gwynedd from c. 682 to c. 720

Idwal Iwrch (English: Idwal the Roebuck), or Idwal ap Cadwaladr (English: Idwal son of Cadwaladr), reigned c. 682 – c. 720, is a figure in the genealogies of the kings of Gwynedd. He was the son of King Cadwaladr (reigned c. 655 – c. 682) and the father of King Rhodri Molwynog (died 754). William Wynne places Cynan Dindaethwy as his son, but other sources have Cynan as the son of Rhodri. The records of this era are scanty, and Idwal's name appears only in the pedigrees of later kings and in a prophecy found in two 14th-century Welsh manuscripts, which says that he will succeed his father Cadwaladr as king.

The only mention of Idwal Iwrch in the historical record is the appearance of his name in genealogies such as those from Jesus College MS. 20 (as the father of "Rhodri Molwynog son of Idwal Iwrch son of Cadwaladr Fendigiad") and the Harleian genealogies (as the father of "Rotri son of Intguaul son of Catgualart"). John Davies'; History of Wales does not mention Idwal, while John Edward Lloyd's History says only that Idwal was Rhodri Molwynog's father. The King of Gwynedd during Idwal's lifetime is not known, and while he is one of the most likely candidates (because he was both the son of a king and the father of a king), there is no sufficiently reliable basis to either assert or deny it.

Idwal's name appears in the Dialogue between Myrddin and his sister Gwenddydd (Welsh: Cyfoesi Myrddin a Gwenddydd ei Chwaer), a Middle Welsh vaticinatory poem whose text is preserved in two medieval Welsh manuscripts, Peniarth 3 (c. 1300) and the Red Book of Hergest (c. 1380–1410). In the text's question-answer form, a succession of "future" kings is prophesied, with Idwal among them. This succession agrees with the historical genealogies from father to son but does not agree with the known royal succession.

== See also ==
- Family tree of Welsh monarchs

Preceded by Cadwaladr	King of Gwynedd c. 682 – c. 720	Succeeded by Rhodri Molwynog
