= List of Manx monarchs =

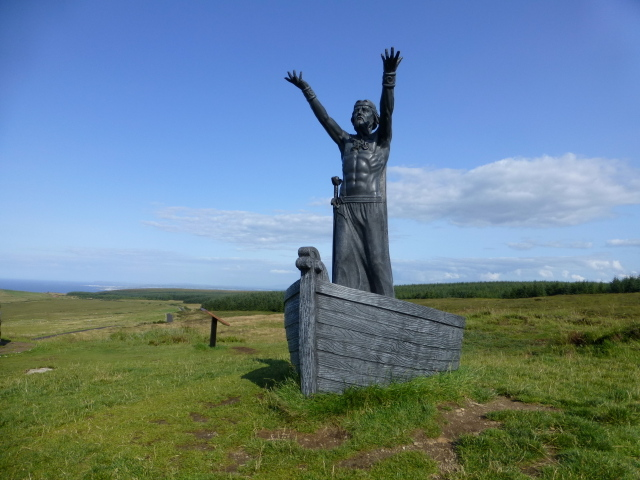
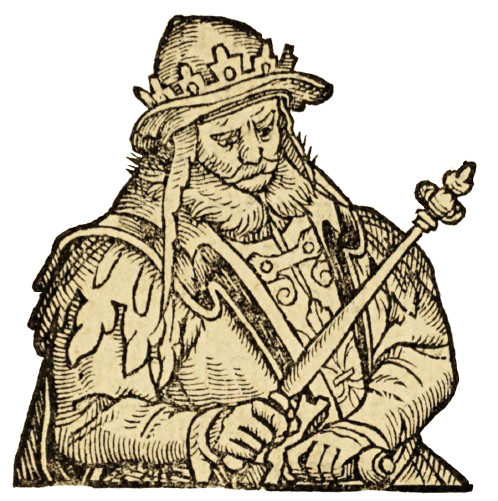
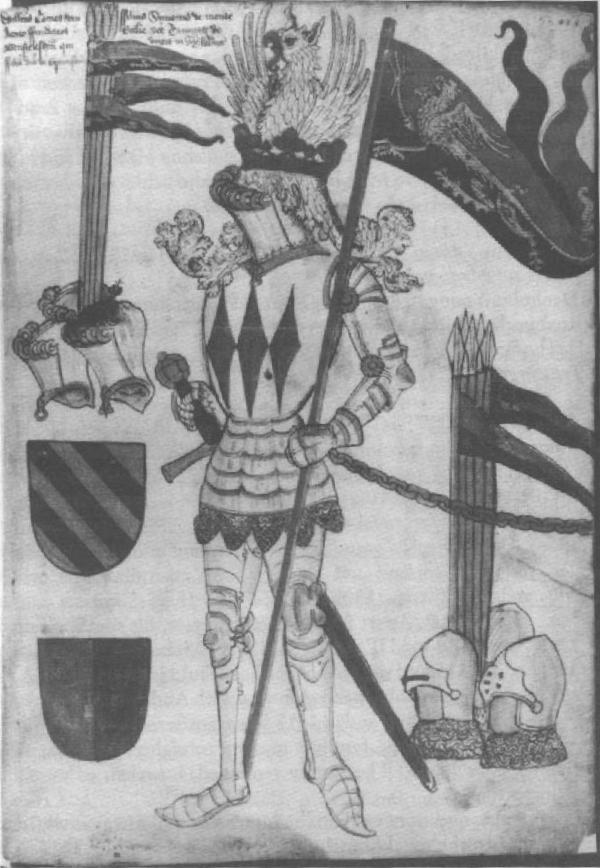
- Top left: Manannán mac Lir is the mythological first ruler of Mann.
- Top right: Merfyn Frych was the last Brythonic King of Ynys Manau.
- Bottom left: William I of Mann was the first independent English King of Mann
- Bottom right: Charles III is the current Lord of Mann.

This article lists the monarchs who have ruled the Isle of Man. The island has been ruled by Brythonic, Irish, Scottish, Hiberno-Norse, English, and British monarchs. Currently, the island is ruled by the Lord of Mann, Charles III, who is represented by Lieutenant Governor, Sir John Lorimer.

== Mythology ==
According to Manx mythology, the first ruler of the Isle of Man was Manannán mac Lir.

== Ulaid rule (578 ‒ 582) ==
The Annals of Ulster record an expedition of the Ulaid to the Isle of Man in 577 and their return in 578 in which King Báetán mac Cairill imposed his authority on the island. In 582 after his death, the annals record the taking of Man by Áedán mac Gabráin.

| Name (Birth–death) | Reign | | | Notes | Royal house |
| Name (Birth–death) | Start | End | Length | Notes | Royal house |
|---|---|---|---|---|---|
| Báetán mac Cairill (d. 581) | 578 | 582 | 4 years | Also King of Ulaid | House of Ulaid |

== Dál Riada rule (582 ‒ c.600) ==
In 582, Dál Riada are recorded taking the island under King Áedán mac Gabráin.

| Name (Birth–death) | Reign | | Notes | Royal house |
| Name (Birth–death) | Start | End | Notes | Royal house |
|---|---|---|---|---|
| Áedán mac Gabráin (d. 581) | 582 | c.600 | Also King of Dál Riada | Cenél nGabrain |

== Bernician-Deiran rule (620 – 633) ==
| Portrait | Name (Birth–death) | Reign | | | Notes | Royal house |
| Portrait | Name (Birth–death) | Start | End | Length | Notes | Royal house |
|---|---|---|---|---|---|---|
| | Edwin of Bernicia & Deira (c.586─632) | 620 | 633 | 13 years | Also King of Bernicia and Deira | House of Deira |

== Kings of Ynys Manau (633 ‒ 825) ==
| Name (Birth–death) | Reign | | Notes | Royal house |
| Name (Birth–death) | Start | End | Notes | Royal house |
|---|---|---|---|---|
| Cynin b. Early 600s | 633 | Mid 600s | Son of Anllech ap Tudwal | House of Alt Clut |
| Mermin Fawr (b. c.630) | Mid 600s | 682 | Son of Cynin ap Anllech | House of Alt Clut |
| Anaraud (b. c.650) | 682 | Late 600s | Son of Mermin Fawr | House of Alt Clut |
| Tudwal III (b. c.670) | Late 600s | Early 700s | Son of Anaraud ap Mermin | House of Alt Clut |
| Iudgual (b. c.690) | Early 700s | Mid 700s | Son of Tudwal ap Anarawd | House of Alt Clut |
| Celemion (b. c.690) | Mid 700s | Late 700s | Daughter of Tudwal ap Anarawd; Possibly ruled jointly with her husband Sandde | House of Alt Clut |
| Sandde (b. c.685) | Mid 700s | 790 | Husband of Celemion ferch Tudwal; Ruled jure uxoris; Male-line descendant of Llywarch Hen | Coeling |
| Elidyr (b. c.730) | 790 | Early 800s | Son of Sandde ap Alcwn and Celemion ferch Tudwal | Coeling |
| Gwriad (b. c.750) | Early 800s | Early 800s | Son of Elidyr ap Sandde; married Esyllt, daughter of Cynan, King of Gwynedd | Coeling |
| Merfyn Frych (c.770─844) | Early 800s | 825 | Son of Gwriad ap Elidyr | Coeling |

== Gwynedd rule (825 ‒ 836) ==
In 825, Merfyn Frych becomes King of Gwynedd bringing Mann under Welsh rule.

| Portrait | Name (Birth–death) | Reign | | | Notes | Royal house |
| Portrait | Name (Birth–death) | Start | End | Length | Notes | Royal house |
|---|---|---|---|---|---|---|
| | Merfyn Frych (c.770─844) | 825 | 836 | 11 years | Son of Gwriad ap Elidyr; Also King of Gwynedd | Coeling |

== Early Norse rule (902 ‒ 914) ==
In about 900, Mann came under the rule of a series of primarily Hiberno-Norse kings and incorporated into the Kingdom of the Isles. Paradoxically, the Norse were responsible for the cementing of the Gaelic language on the island, which utterly replaced the native Brittonic. The island has produced a more densely distributed Viking Age archaeology than anywhere else in the British Isles, but the written records for this time period are poor.

| Name (Birth–death) | Reign | | Titles | Notes | Royal house | Vassalage |
| Name (Birth–death) | Start | End | Titles | Notes | Royal house | Vassalage |
|---|---|---|---|---|---|---|
| Otir | 912 | 914 | Jarl and "Master of the Isle of Man" | | Otir | Possibly as a vassal of Ragnall ua Ímair |
| Bárid mac Oitir | 914 | 914 | N/A | Likely son of Ottir | Otir | Independent? |

== Kingdom of the Isles (914 ‒ 1265) ==
Since the emergence of Somerled and his descendants in the 12th century, the Manx kings began to lose territory and power in the Hebrides. Before the reigns of the three sons of Olaf the Black, the Manx kings styled themselves "King of the Isles". By the time of the reigns of Olaf's sons, the kings had begun to style themselves "King of Mann and the Isles".

| Name (Birth–death) | Reign | | Titles | Notes | Royal house | Vassalage |
| Name (Birth–death) | Start | End | Titles | Notes | Royal house | Vassalage |
|---|---|---|---|---|---|---|
| Ragnall ua Ímair (d. c.921) | 914 | 921 | King of Northumbria | Defeated Bárid in a naval battle off Man in 914; Grandson of Ímar, King of Dublin | Uí Ímair | Independent |
| Ragnall ua Ímair (d. c.921) | 914 | 921 | King of Northumbria | Defeated Bárid in a naval battle off Man in 914; Grandson of Ímar, King of Dublin | Uí Ímair | Northumbria |
| Gothfrith ua Ímair (d.934) | 920s | 930s | King of Northumbria; King of Dublin | Grandson of Ímar, King of Dublin | Uí Ímair | Northumbria & Dublin |
| Olaf Guthfrithson (d.941) | 930s | 941 | King of Northumbria; King of Dublin | Son of Gofraid ua Ímair; Married a daughter of Constantine II of Scotland | Uí Ímair | Northumbria & Dublin |
| Amlaíb Cuarán | c.941 | 980 | King of the Isles (and possibly King of Mann); King of Northumbria; King of Dublin | Son of Sitric Cáech; Died on Iona in 981. | Uí Ímair | Northumbria & Dublin |
| Maccus mac Arailt | 980 | ? | King of the Isles | Said to have been "brought under subjection" by Edgar the Peaceful, King of England who died in 975 | Uí Ímair | Kingdom of England |
| Gofraid mac Arailt | ? | 989 | King of the Isles | Brother of Maccus mac Arailt | Uí Ímair | |
| Gilli | 990 | ? | Jarl | Operated under Sigurd the Stout, Earl of Orkney & Mormaer of Caithness. Married to Sigurd's sister. Sigurd himself was a vassal of the King of Norway. | | Jarldom of Orkeny |
| Ragnall mac Gofraid | ? | 1005 | King of the Isles | Son of Gofraid mac Arailt | Uí Ímair | |
| Sigurd the Stout | 1005 | 1014 | Earl of Orkney & Mormaer of Caithness | | Orkney | Kingdom of Norway |
| Einar Sigurdsson | 1014 | 1016? | Joint Earl of Orkney | | | Jarldom of Orkeny |
| Håkon Eiriksson | 1016 | 1030 | Ruler of the Suðreyar; Governor ofNorway | Nephew of Cnut the Great | Lade | North Sea Empire |
| Olaf Sigtryggsson | 1030 | 1034 | King of Mann and many of the other islands of Denmark | Son of Sitric Silkbeard and grandson of Amlaíb Cuarán | Uí Ímair | Independent |
| Thorfinn the Mighty | c.1035 | c.1058 | Earl of Orkney & Mormaer of Caithness | | Orkney | Kingdom of Norway |
| Ímar mac Arailt | c.1045? | ? | King of Dublin | Ruler of Dublin and possibly Mann. In 1045 Ímar crushed the Ulaid in a raid on Rathlin which may be evidence that he also controlled Mann at this point. | Uí Ímair | Dublin |
| Echmarcach mac Ragnaill | 1052 | 1061 | King of Mann | Probably ruler of both Dublin and Mann prior to 1052, when he was expelled from the former by Diarmait mac Maíl na mBó. Possibly son of Ragnall mac Gofraid and thus possibly a King of Innse Gall as well. | Uí Ímair | Dublin |
| Murchad mac Diarmata | 1061 | 1070 | King of Dublin and Mann? | | Uí Ceinnselaig | Dublin |
| Diarmait mac Maíl na mBó | 1070 | 1072 | King of Dublin and the Isles | Father of Murchad, but who ruled after him over Dublin "and, one assumes, Man" | Uí Ceinnselaig | Dublin |
| Godred Sitricson | 1072 | 1074 | King of Man | | Uí Ímair | Independent |
| Fingal Godredson (d. c.1070) | 1074 | 1070s | King of Man | Son of Godred Sitricson | Uí Ímair | Independent |
| Godred Crovan (d.1095) | 1070s | 1095 | King of Dublin and the Isles | Son of "Harald the Black of Ysland" | Crovan Dynasty | Independent |
| Lagmann Godredsson | 1095 | 1098? | | Eldest son of Godred Crovan. Whether Lagmann began his reign before or after Magnus Barelegs's arrival is not known for certain. | Crovan Dynasty | Independent |
| MacMaras | | d. 1098 | Jarl of Man | Each Earl of "one half of Man" in a civil war ending in the Battle of Santwat, in which both die. | ? | Independent |
| Ottar | | d. 1098 | Jarl of Man | Each Earl of "one half of Man" in a civil war ending in the Battle of Santwat, in which both die. | Cotter | Independent |
| Magnus Barelegs | 1098 | 1102 | King of Norway Possibly King of the Isles | Direct Norwegian rule | Hardrada | Kingdom of Norway |
| Sigurd Magnusson | 1102 | 1103 | King of Norway | Nominal control by under-age son of Magnus Barelegs | Hardrada | Kingdom of Norway |
| Lagmann Godredsson | 1103 | 1110 | | Eldest son of Godred Crovan | Crovan Dynasty | Independent |
| Domnall mac Taidc Uí Briain | 1111 | 1112 | Regent during the minority of Olave the Red | Nephew of Muirchertach Ua Briain. Expelled by the Islesmen. | Meic Taidc (Uí Briain) | Independent |
| Olave the Red | 1112 | 1152 | | Son of Godred Crovan | Crovan Dynasty | Independent |
| Godred the Black | 1154 | 1158 | King of Man and the Isles King of Man (1156─1158) | Son of Olave the Red Kingdom partitioned in 1156 after the Battle of Epiphany but Mann remains under Godred until 1158. | Crovan Dynasty | Independent |
| Somerled | 1158 | 1164 | Lord of Argyll, Kintyre and Lorne | Son-in-law of Olave the Red, and son of GilleBride of the old royal house of Dalriada, and a Norse woman. By 1158 Somerled was Rex Insularum, King of the Isles. His dominion covered 25,000 square miles and more than 500 islands. | Dál Riada | Independent |
| Reginald | 1164 | 1164 | No record | Half-brother of Godred the Black | Crovan Dynasty | Independent |
| Godred the Black | 1164 | 1187 | King of the Isles | Re-instated | Crovan Dynasty | Independent |
| Ragnvald | 1188 | 1226 | King of the Isles | Son of Godred the Black | Crovan Dynasty | Independent |
| Olaf the Black | 1226 | 1237 | King of Mann and the Isles | Half-brother of Raghnall mac Gofraidh | Crovan Dynasty | Independent |
| Óspakr-Hákon | 1230 | 1230 | King of the Suðreyjar | Son of Dubgall mac Somairle? | Dál Riada | Independent |
| Gofraid Donn | 1230 | 1230s | | Son of Raghnall mac Gofraidh | Crovan Dynasty | Independent |
| Harald Olafsson | 1237 | 1248 | King of Mann and the Isles | Son of Olaf the Black | Crovan Dynasty | Kingdom of Norway |
| Ragnvald Olafsson | 1248 | 1249 | King of Mann and the Isles | Son of Olaf the Black, his rule was brief | Crovan Dynasty | Kingdom of Norway |
| Harald Godredsson | 1249 | 1250 | King of Mann | Son of Gofraid Donn and grandson of Raghnall mac Gofraidh | Crovan Dynasty | Kingdom of Norway |
| Magnus Olafsson | 1252 | 1265? | King of Mann and the Isles | Son of Olaf the Black | Crovan Dynasty | Kingdom of Norway |

== Scottish and English rule (1265 – 1333) ==
Between 1265 and 1333, Mann was ruled directly by the Kings of Scotland (1265–1290, 1293–1296, 1313–1317, 1328–1333) or the Kings of England (1290–1293, 1296–1313, 1317–1328).

| Name (Birth–death) | Reign | | Titles | Notes | Royal house |
| Name (Birth–death) | Start | End | Titles | Notes | Royal house |
Kingdom of Scotland (1265‒1290)
| Alexander III (1249–1286) | 1265 | 1286 | King of Scots | Mann annexed by Scotland | Dunkeld |
| Margaret (1283–1290) | 1286 | 1290 | Queen of Scots | Granddaughter of Alexander III | Sverre |
Kingdom of England (1290‒1293)
| Edward I (1272–1307) | 1290 | 1293 | King of England | Mann annexed by England | Plantagenet |
Kingdom of Scotland (1293–1296)
| John Balliol (1292–1296) | 1293 | 1296 | King of Scots | Mann annexed by Scotland | Balliol |
Kingdom of England (1296–1313)
| Edward I (1272–1307) | 1296 | 1307 | King of England | Mann annexed by England | Plantagenet |
| Edward II (1307–1327) | 1307 | 1327 | King of England | Son of Edward I | Plantagenet |
Kingdom of Scotland (1313–1317)
| Robert I the Bruce (1306–1329) | 1313 | 1317 | King of Scots | Mann annexed by Scotland | Bruce |
Kingdom of England (1317‒1328)
| Edward III (1327–1377) | 1317 | 1328 | King of England | Mann annexed by England | Plantagenet |
Kingdom of Scotland (1328–1333)
| Robert I the Bruce (1306–1329) | 1329 | 1329 | King of Scots | Mann annexed by Scotland | Bruce |
| David II (1329–1371) | 1329 | 1333 | King of Scots | Son of Robert I | Bruce |
Kingdom of England (1317‒1328)
| Edward III (1327–1377) | 1333 | 1333 | King of England | Mann annexed by England | Plantagenet |

== Kings of Mann (1333 ‒ 1399) ==
| Portrait/Arms | Name (Birth–death) | Reign | | Titles | Notes | Royal house | Vassalage |
| Portrait/Arms | Name (Birth–death) | Start | End | Titles | Notes | Royal house | Vassalage |
|---|---|---|---|---|---|---|---|
| | William I (1301–1344) | 1333 | 1344 | King of Mann Earl of Salisbury | In 1333, Edward III of England renounced all royal claims over Mann, and recognised it as an independent kingdom. | Montagu | Kingdom of England |
| | William II (1328–1397) | 1344 | 1392 | King of Mann Earl of Salisbury | Son of William I of Mann | Montagu | Kingdom of England |
| | William III (c.1350–1399) | 1392 | 1399 | King of Mann Earl of Wiltshire | Title purchased from William II of Mann. He was executed for his support of Richard II in his struggle with Henry Bolingbroke and the Kingdom of Mann passed to the English Crown. | Scrope | Kingdom of England |

== English suzerainty (1399 ‒ 1504) ==
| Portrait/Arms | Name (Birth–death) | Reign | | Titles | Notes | Royal house |
| Portrait/Arms | Name (Birth–death) | Start | End | Titles | Notes | Royal house |
|---|---|---|---|---|---|---|
| | Henry IV (1367–1413) | 1399 | 19 October 1399 | King of England | Claimed Mann by Right of Conquest | Lancaster |
| | Henry I (1367–1413) | 19 October 1399 | 1405 | King of Mann Earl of Northumberland | Henry IV granted the Island, as a fiefdom under the English Crown to Henry Percy. He was officially made Lord of Mann but styled himself as King of Mann. He was stripped of this title following a rebellion in 1405. | Percy |
| | John I (c.1350–1414) | 1405 | 1414 | King of Mann | Henry IV granted the Island, as a fiefdom under the English Crown to Sir John Stanley. | Stanley |
| | John II (c.1386–1437) | 1405 | 1437 | King of Mann | Son of John I of Mann | Stanley |
| | Thomas I (c.1405–1459) | 1437 | February 1459 | King of Mann Baron Stanley | Son of John II of Mann | Stanley |
| | Thomas II (1435–1504) | February 1459 | 29 July 1504 | King of Mann Earl of Derby | Son of Thomas I of Mann Married Lady Margaret Beaufort, mother of Henry VII of England | Stanley |
| | Thomas III (1485–1521) | 29 July 1504 | 23 May 1521 | King of Mann Earl of Derby | Son of Thomas II of Mann | Stanley |

== Lords of Mann (1521 ‒ present) ==
Edward Stanley, 3rd Earl of Derby, the son of Thomas Stanley, 2nd Earl of Derby, did not take the style "King", and he and his successors were generally known instead as Lord of Mann. However, the Latin style Rex Manniae et Insularum (King of Mann and the Isles) continued to be occasionally used in official documents until at least the 17th century.

In 1765, the title was revested in the Crown of Great Britain; thus today the title, Lord of Mann, is used by King Charles III. Queen Victoria was styled as Lady of Mann, whereas, title "Lord" was used by Queen Elizabeth II.

| Portrait/Arms | Name (Birth–death) | Reign | | Titles | Notes | Royal house |
| Portrait/Arms | Name (Birth–death) | Start | End | Titles | Notes | Royal house |
|---|---|---|---|---|---|---|
| | Edward (1509–1572) | 23 May 1521 | 24 October 1572 | Lord of Mann Earl of Derby | Son of Thomas III of Mann | Stanley |
| | Henry II (1531–1593) | 24 October 1572 | 25 September 1593 | Lord of Mann Earl of Derby | Son of Edward of Mann | Stanley |
| | Ferdinando (1559–1594) | 25 September 1593 | 16 April 1594 | Lord of Mann Earl of Derby | Son of Henry Stanley, 4th Earl of Derby | Stanley |

=== Succession dispute (1594–1607) ===
After Ferdinando's death, the succession is disputed between his daughters and his brother William, Earl of Derby. Ultimately the English Privy Council awarded the island to the daughters of Ferdinando. However, they were all below the age of majority at the time so James I of England appointed two successive interim Lords of Mann to act as regents.

| Portrait/Arms | Name (Birth–death) | Reign | | Titles | Notes | House |
| Portrait/Arms | Name (Birth–death) | Start | End | Titles | Notes | House |
|---|---|---|---|---|---|---|
| | Henry Howard (1540–1614) | 1607 | 1608 | Lord of Mann Earl of Northampton | Made interim Lord by letters patent of James I of England | Howard |
| | Robert Cecil (1563–1612) | 1608 | 1609 | Lord of Mann Earl of Salisbury | Made interim Lord by letters patent of James I of England | Cecil |

In 1609, the Parliament of England passed the Assurance of the Isle of Man Act 1609 (7 Jas. 1. c. 4 Pr.) which established the title in law as Lord of Mann. The lordship was conferred by letters patent dated 7 July 1609 upon William Stanely, Earl of Derby.

| Portrait/Arms | Name (Birth–death) | Reign | | Titles | Notes | Royal house |
| Portrait/Arms | Name (Birth–death) | Start | End | Titles | Notes | Royal house |
|---|---|---|---|---|---|---|
| | William IV (1561–1642) | 7 July 1609 | 1612 | Lord of Mann Earl of Derby | Son of Henry Stanley, 4th Earl of Derby | Stanley |
| | Elizabeth (1575–1627) | 1612 | 10 March 1627 | Lord of Mann Countess of Derby | Wife of William Stanley, 6th Earl of Derby who granted her the title Lord of Mann. | De Vere |
| | James (1607–1651) | 10 March 1627 | 15 October 1651 | Lord of Mann Earl of Derby | Son of William Stanley, 6th Earl of Derby and Elizabeth Stanley, Countess of Derby | Stanley |

== See also ==
- List of Manx royal consorts
- King of Ynys Manau
- List of Kings of Mann and the Isles
- King of Mann
- Lord of Mann
- Governor of the Isle of Man
- Lieutenant Governor of the Isle of Man
- History of the Isle of Man
