= Ynys Manau =

Kingdom on the Isle of Man, 550–825 AD

Kingdom of Ynys Manau
- c.550–825 (578‒582: Ulaid) (582‒c.600: Dál Riada) (620–633: Northumbria)
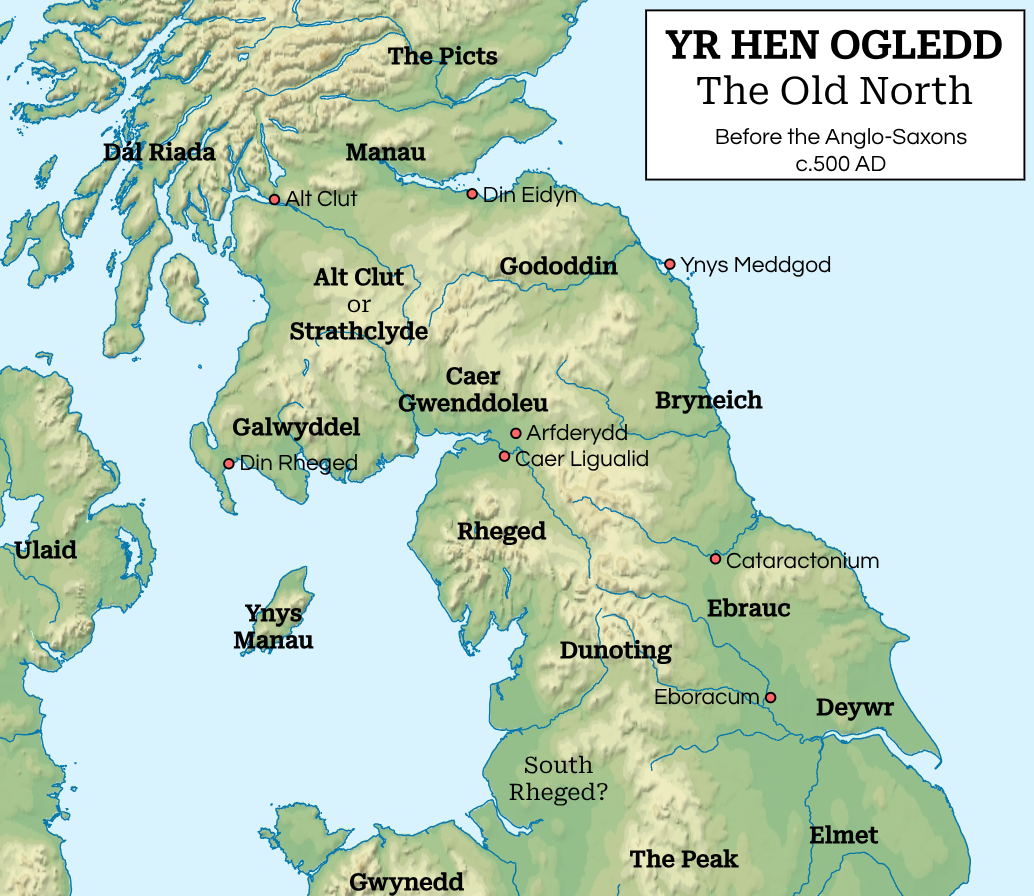
- The Hen Ogledd
- Other languages: Common Brythonic
- Government: Monarchy
- King
- History
  - Established: c.550
  - Senyllt flees to Mann: c.550
  - Báetán mac Cairill invades: 578
  - Áedán mac Gabráin invades: 582
  - Independence: c.600
  - Edwin invades: 620
  - Independence: 633
  - Merfyn Frych becomes King of Gwynedd: 826
  - Disestablished: 578
Preceded by	Succeeded by
Kingdom of Galwyddel	Kingdom of Gwynedd
- Today part of: Isle of Man

Ynys Manau (often spelt Ynys Manaw, which is the modern Welsh spelling) was a Brythonic kingdom that variously ruled over the Isle of Man from around 550 AD until 825 AD.

== History ==
Ynys Manau was originally a territory of the Kingdom of Galwyddel (modern Galloway) until the mainland was invaded by the Kingdom of Rheged under Urien around 550 AD. The King of Galwyddel, Senyllt ap Dingat, was forced to flee to the Isle of Man, where he established a lineage of kings.

In 578, during or following the reign of King Neithon ap Senyllt, Ynys Manau was occupied by the Kingdom of Ulaid under its king, Báetán mac Cairill. This was until 582 when the Kingdom of Dál Riada took control of the island under its king, Áedán mac Gabráin. At some point in the late 500s, Neithon's son Rhun ap Neithon regained control over Ynys Manau, re-establishing the Brythonic Kingdom.

The Isle of Man came under the rule of Edwin, King of Bernicia and Deira, from 620 to 633.

The lineage of Senyllt ap Dingat continued to rule an independent Ynys Manau until 825, when Merfyn Frych became King of Gwynedd and incorporated the Isle of Man into that kingdom.

== List of kings ==
Name (Birth–death)	Reign		Notes	Royal house
Name (Birth–death)	Start	End	Notes	Royal house
Senyllt b. c.510	c.550	Late 500s	Son of Dingat ap Tudwal	House of Alt Clut
Neithon b. c.530	Late 500s	578	Son of Senyllt ap Dingat	House of Alt Clut
Báetán mac Cairill (d. 581)	578	582	Also King of Ulaid	House of Ulaid
Áedán mac Gabráin (d. 581)	582	c.600	Also King of Dál Riada	Cenél nGabrain
Rhun b. Mid 500s	Late 500s	Early 600s	Son of Neithon ap Senyllt	House of Alt Clut
Tudwal II b. late 500s	Early 600s	Mid 600s	Son of Rhun ap Neithon	House of Alt Clut
Anllech b. c.590	Mid 600s	620	Son of Tudwal ap Rhun	House of Alt Clut
Edwin of Northumbria (c.586─632)	620	633	Also King of Bernicia and Deira	House of Deira
Cynin b. Early 600s	633	Mid 600s	Son of Anllech ap Tudwal	House of Alt Clut
Mermin Fawr (b. c.630)	Mid 600s	682	Son of Cynin ap Anllech	House of Alt Clut
Anaraud (b. c.650)	682	Late 600s	Son of Mermin Fawr	House of Alt Clut
Tudwal III (b. c.670)	Late 600s	Early 700s	Son of Anaraud ap Mermin	House of Alt Clut
Iudgual (b. c.690)	Early 700s	Mid 700s	Son of Tudwal ap Anarawd	House of Alt Clut
Celemion (b. c.690)	Mid 700s	Late 700s	Daughter of Tudwal ap Anarawd; Possibly ruled jointly with her husband Sandde	House of Alt Clut
Sandde (b. c.685)	Mid 700s	790	Husband of Celemion ferch Tudwal; Ruled jure uxoris Male-line descendant of Llywarch Hen	Coeling
Elidyr (b. c.730)	790	Early 800s	Son of Sandde ap Alcwn and Celemion ferch Tudwal	Coeling
Gwriad (b. c.750)	Early 800s	Early 800s	Son of Elidyr ap Sandde; married Esyllt, daughter of Cynan, King of Gwynedd	Coeling
Merfyn Frych (c.770─844)	Early 800s	825	Son of Gwriad ap Elidyr; Ynys Manau annexed into Gwynedd	Coeling
