= Gwriad ab Elidyr =

King of Man (died c. 800)

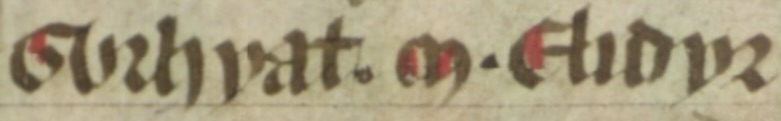
- Gwriad's name as occurs in Jesus College MS 20 f. 37^{r}, reading GỼrhyat m[ab] Elidyr

King of the Isle of Man
- Reign: c. late 8th c.
- Predecessor: ?Elidyr ap Sanddef
- Successor: Merfyn Frych
- Died: c. 800 AD
- Burial: ?Ballaterson Treen, Maughold
- Spouse: Esyllt ferch Cynan Dindaethwy
- Issue: Merfyn Frych ap Gwriad; Cadrod ap Gwriad
- Dynasty: Coeling (allegedly)
- Father: Elidyr ap Sanddef

Gwriad ab Elidyr (Welsh pronunciation: [ˈguːrjad ab ɛˈlɪdɪr]) was an eighth-century British figure who was likely king of the Isle of Man. Very little is known of him, but he is one of the few early medieval Welsh figures with contemporary evidence of his existence; namely a stone cross erected near Maughold likely bearing his name.

Gwriad's marriage with Esyllt ferch Cynan Dindaethwy, a member of the First Dynasty of Gwynedd, produced the king of Gwynedd Merfyn Frych. Merfyn succeeded his mother's relative Hywel ap Caradog and ruled Gwynedd from 826 to 844, founding the Second Dynasty of Gwynedd. Thus, Gwriad was the ancestor both of this dynasty and the dynasty of Deheubarth through his great-grandson Cadell ap Rhodri.

== Background ==
Gwriad's background is obscure. However, because his descendants ruled over Gwynedd for almost five centuries, Gwriad's ancestry remained a source of interest long after his death. The earliest surviving record of his patrilineal descent is found in the Vita Griffini filii Conani, a biography of Gruffudd ap Cynan (d. 1137) likely compiled early in the reign of Gruffudd's successor Owain Gwynedd (r. 1137–1170). Gruffudd ap Cynan's genealogy in this text bolsters his claim to Gwynedd and adds to Gruffudd's prestige by tracing Gwriad's ancestry to many legendary figures such as Dwg, son of Llywarch Hen, Coel Hen, and Beli Mawr. (Note: Merfyn's genealogy to Beli Mawr in the Vita Griffini is as follows: ...Mervyn Vrych, filii Gwriat, filii Elideri, filii Sandef, filii Alkwm, filii Tagit, filii Gwen, filii Dwc, filii Llywarch senioris, fili Elidir Llydanwyn, filii Meirchiawn Gvl, filii Gorwst Lledlwm, filii Keneu, fili Coeli Godebawc, fili Tegwan Cloff, filii Dehewent, filii Vrbani, filii Gradi, filii Rivedeli, filii Rydeyrni, filii Eudeyrni, filii Eudyganti, filii Eudos, filii Eudolei, filii Avallach, fili Aflechi, filii Beli Magni...) Gwriad's supposed male-line ancestors appear for the first time in this pedigree because previous genealogies recorded the descent of the Second Dynasty of Gwynedd instead through Gwriad's wife Esyllt, who linked the family to Cunedda, legendary founder of Gwynedd. The figures recorded beyond Gwriad's great-grandfather Alcwn are likely fabricated, as the generations between Alcwn and Dwg ap Llywarch Hen appear to be directly copied from the pedigree of Cunedda in Harley MS 3859.

The genealogies from Jesus MS 20 record that Gwriad's grandmother was Celenion, a daughter of Tudwal Tudglyd and granddaughter of Merfyn Mawr, whose lineage also survives in Harley MS 3859. (Note: Jesus MS 20: [§19] Rodri Maỽr m. Meruyn m. Guriat m. Elidyr m. Celenion merch Tutwal Tuclith m. Anaraỽd Gỽalchcrỽn m. Meruyn Maỽr m. Ky[n]uyn m. Anllech m. Tutwaỽl m. Run m. Neidaon m. Senilth Hael, tryd[yd] hael o’r gogled. Senilth m. Dingat m. Tutwaỽl m. Edneuet m. Dunaỽt m. Maxen Wledic, val y mae vchot.) (Note: Harley MS 3859's "Manx Pedigree": [§4] ...Tutagual map Anara[u]t map Mermin map Anthec map Tutagual map Run map Neithon map Senill map Dinacat map Tutagual map Eidinet map Anthun map Maxim Guletic, qui occidit Gratianum regem Romanorum.) Merfyn Mawr is understood to be identical with one Muirmin who was killed in Mano in the year 681 according to the Annals of Ulster. The pedigree of the kings of Man in Harley MS 3859 furthermore traces Merfyn Mawr's lineage back to Ednyfed ab Annun Ddu and Magnus Maximus. Ben Guy identifies Ednyfed as being an adaptation of Nemed mac Agnoman or Agnon, ancestor of the Fir Bolg in the Lebor Gabála Érenn tradition upon which the Historia Brittonum draws. The Historia Brittonum was copied in Harley MS 3859 as well, and its narrative appears to have been the inspiration for many genealogies in the manuscript. Furthermore, the Historia Brittonum records that the Fir Bolg, Annun/Agnon's people, were settled in the Isle of Man. Regardless of the total accuracy of the surviving pedigrees, Gwriad clearly has a very strong connection with Man.

This connection with the Isle of Man is also referenced in 'Cyfoesi Myrddin a Gwenddydd ei Chwaer', an imaginary dialogue composed at the beginning of the thirteenth century between the legendary sixth-century prophet Myrddin Wyllt and his sister Gwenddydd, who asks the mad seer to name the successive rulers of Britain. In line 111, Myrddin prophesies the rule of "Meruin Vrych o dir Manaỽ", 'Merfyn Frych from the land of Manaw', Manaw being the Welsh name of the Isle of Man. Despite its occurrence in a legendary pseudo-prophecy, it is understood that this poem repeats good information Merfyn's background, perhaps drawing on a now-lost 'tale of Merfyn Frych'. Therefore, the family all but certainly were originally from the Isle of Man, and likely were its rulers.

== Gwriad's Cross ==
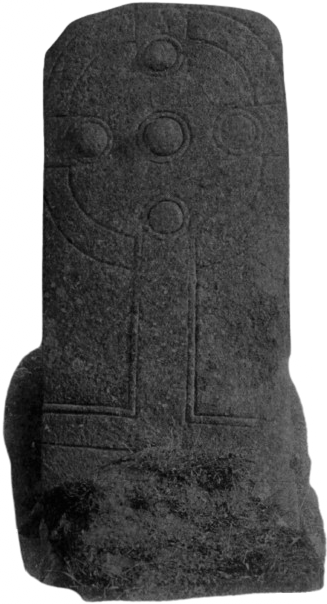
Granite slab inscribed with a cross, likely erected in memory of Gwriad.

The clearest and most striking evidence connecting Gwriad's with the Isle of Man is found inscribed on a standing stone found on the island. The stone perhaps originally stood in the burial ground of the old keeill of Ballaterson Treen, but was moved to a roadside hedge near Port e Vullen before 1841, and ultimately to Maughold parish church at the urging of Philip Moore Callow Kermode in 1897. The stone is a granite slab carved with a ring-headed cross, dated to the eighth or ninth centuries. However, Thomas Charles-Edwards suggests a more specific date of c. 800 AD for the raising of the cross, at the dawn of the Viking Age. The stone appears to be one of many inscribed slabs near Maughold which may have been carved by a single mason, perhaps a member of the local community. The modern parish of Maughold, named for saint Maughold, was the site of an important monastic community in the early Middle Ages.

The stone bears an inscription reading CRUX GURIAT on its right-hand edge in Insular half-uncial letters, characteristically used in manuscripts of the erly Middle Ages in Britain and Ireland. The early medieval religious foundation near Maughold was a site offering a "measure of monastic learning", and thus would have been involved with the production of manuscripts. The translation of the inscription is 'Guriat's cross'. However, Guriat is the standard Old Welsh spelling of the name Gwriad, with the final t representing /d/, and therefore both the honorand and the inscriber were very probably Welsh-speakers familiar with the standard forms of the written language. Kermode's 1907 report includes a recollection of a Maughold local recalling that the field where the stone was first found formerly yielded lintel graves as a result of ploughing. It is very likely that Guriat honoured by the stone was buried near the stone's original position, probably the burial ground of the local keeill associated with the monastery.

The inscription on the cross, reading CRUX GURIAT

Sir John Rhŷs first suggested in 1897 that the Guriat memorialised on this stone was Gwriad, father of Merfyn Frych, king of Gwynedd. This identification has been largely followed by subsequent scholars, although Ben Guy notes that while the Gwriad honoured in the cross’ inscription was certainly a leading and elite figure and probably this Gwriad, it is also possible that the man could also be another family member of Merfyn's, given the recurrence of the name ‘Gwriad’ in the family. Thomas Charles-Edwards, Bedwyr Lewis Jones, and Patrick Sims-Williams also tentatively support the identification of the man memorialised on this stone with Gwriad ab Elidyr.

Thomas Charles-Edwards speculates that the existence of two royal pedigrees of the Isle of Man may suggest that the island may originally have been ruled by two different families whose territory was divided by the central range of mountains running west to east from modern Peel to Maughold. The Maughold area, situated at the eastern end of the central mountain range, could therefore have been a good place to express control over both the north and the south of the island, and may have been Gwriad's centre of power.

== Marriage and legacy ==
At some point, Gwriad married Esyllt, daughter of Cynan Dindaethwy, King of Gwynedd. This marriage produced two children: Merfyn Frych, and Cadrod, from whom the later lords of Glynllifon claimed descent. An alliance between Man and Gwynedd may have made sense, as the islands of Anglesey and Man are close enough together that one may see one from the other on a clear day. It is not known when Gwriad died, but Gwynedd descended into civil war from 812, with Cynan and his rival Hywel Farf-fehinog struggling to master Anglesey and secure the kingship of Gwynedd. Cynan suddenly died in 816, and Hywel ruled until 825. However, by the end of 826, Merfyn Frych ap Gwriad was King of Gwynedd, having seized power by a coup-d'état, probably through asserting continuity with Cynan's claim to Gwynedd. It is likely that Merfyn had earlier sided with Cynan in the civil war, and was perhaps helped to the throne of Gwynedd by his grandfather's former supporters.

The dynasty Merfyn founded, called the Merfynion after him, continued to dominate the Irish Sea region with their possession of Anglesey and the Isle of Man until the turn of the tenth century. From Merfyn were descended the Second Dynasty of Gwynedd, which he established, and later the House of Deheubarth through his great-grandson Cadell ap Rhodri. Nevertheless, Merfyn's rise to power would not have been possible without his father's marriage to his mother Esyllt, a member of the First Dynasty of Gwynedd.

== See also ==
- Old North (Britain)
- Wales in the Early Middle Ages
- Scotland in the Early Middle Ages
- History of the Isle of Man

== Bibliography ==
- Bartrum, P. C., ed. (1976). Welsh Genealogies: AD 300-1400. Cardiff: University of Wales Press. doi:10.20391/40837b6f-1887-4afd-9c6e-9b7e3a122693. ISBN 070830561X. Archived from the original on 6 June 2023.
- Charles-Edwards, Thomas (2013). Wales and the Britons, 350-1064. Oxford: Oxford University Press. ISBN 9780198217312. IA walesbritons35010000char.
- Guy, Ben (2020). Medieval Welsh Genealogy: an Introduction and Textual Study. Woodbridge: Boydell Press. doi:10.1017/9781787448988. ISBN 9781783275137.
  —— (2023). "Manaw of the Britons: the Pre-Viking Kings of Man" (PDF). Isle of Man Studies. 18. Isle of Man Natural History and Antiquarian Society: 145–161. doi:10.5284/1050092. Archived from the original (PDF) on 8 August 2024.
  ——, ed. (2025). "Cyfoesi Myrddin a Gwenddydd ei Chwaer". An Edition of the Welsh Merlin Poetry. Swansea: Swansea University. Archived from the original on 26 October 2025.
- Hennessey, William M., ed. (1887). Annala Uladh - Annals of Ulster: otherwise Annala Senait - Annals of Senat; a Chronicle of Irish Affairs from A.D. 431 to A.D. 1540. Vol. 1, A. D. 431-1056. Dublin: HM Stationery Office. IA cu31924091786537.
- Jones, Bedwyr Lewis (1990). "Gwriad's Heritage: Links between Wales and the Isle of Man in the Early Middle Ages". Transactions of the Honourable Society of the Cymmrodorion. The Honourable Society of the Cymmrodorion: 29–44. hdl:10107/1423395. ISSN 0959-3632.
- Kermode, Phillip Moore Callow (1897). "A Welsh Inscription in the Isle of Man". Zeitschrift für celtische Philologie. 1. Max Niemeyer Verlag: 48–51. doi:10.1515/zcph.1897.1.1.48. IA zeitschriftfrc01meyeuoft/page/48.
  —— (1907). Manx Crosses: or, the inscribed and sculptured monuments of the Isle of Man from about the end of the fifth to the beginning of the thirteenth century. London: Bemrose & Sons. ISBN 9780198217312. IA b24855078.
- Morris, John, ed. (1980). Nennius: British History and The Welsh Annals. London: Phillimore. ISBN 9780847662647.
- Rhŷs, John (1897). "Note on Guriat". Zeitschrift für celtische Philologie. 1. Max Niemeyer Verlag: 52–3. doi:10.1515/zcph.1897.1.1.52. IA zeitschriftfrc01meyeuoft/page/52.
- Russell, Paul, ed. (2005). Vita Griffini Filii Conani: the Medieval Life of Gruffudd ap Cynan. Cardiff: University of Wales Press. ISBN 9780708318935.
- Sims-Williams, Patrick (2003). The Celtic Inscriptions of Britain: Phonology and Chronology, c. 400-1200. Oxford: Publications of the Philological Society. ISBN 1405109033.
- Thornton, David E. (1996). "The Genealogy of Gruffudd ap Cynan". In Maund, K.L. (ed.). Gruffudd ap Cynan: a Collaborative Biography. Woodbridge: Boydell Press. pp. 79–108. ISBN 0851153895.
- Wilson, D M (2018). Manx Crosses: a handbook of stone sculpture 500-1040 in the Isle of Man. Oxford: Manx National Heritage in association with Archaeopress. ISBN 9781784917562.
