= Caradog ap Meirion =

King of Gwynedd from c. 754 to c. 798

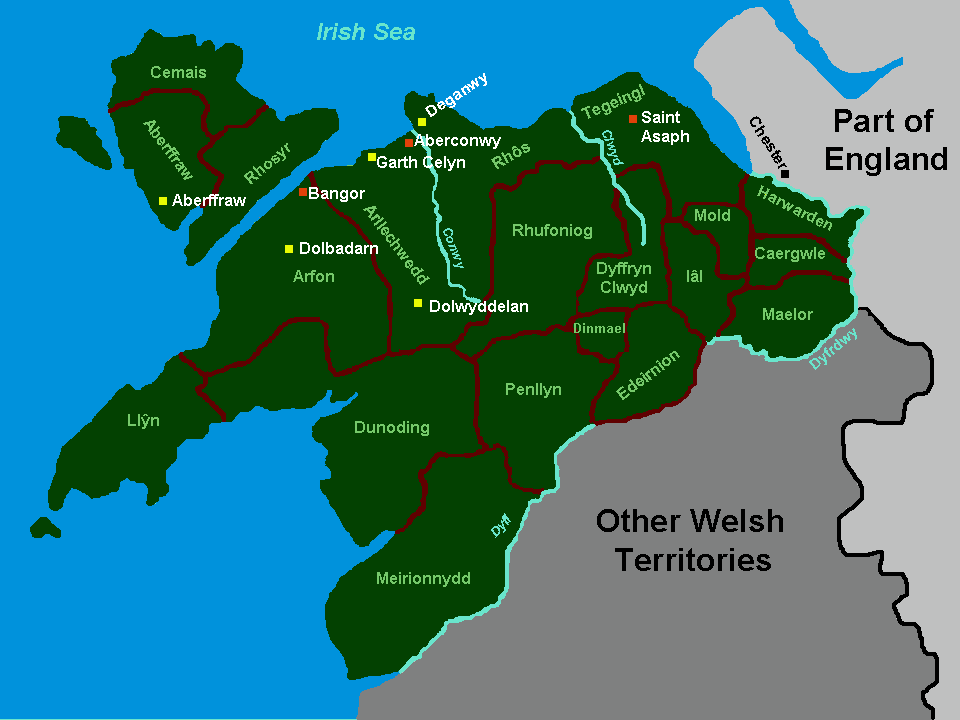
A general map of Gwynedd showing the cantrefi

Caradog ap Meirion reigned c. 754 – c. 798, died c. 798, was a king of Gwynedd in North West Wales. This Welsh name means Caradog son of Meirion.

This era in the history of Kingdom of Gwynedd was not notable and, given the lack of reliable information available, serious histories such as that by John Davies do not mention Caradog, or (like that of John Edward Lloyd) mention his name only in a footnote quoting the year of his death in the Annales Cambriae.

It is assumed Caradog rose to the throne upon the death of King Rhodri Molwynog, which Phillimore's reconstruction of the Annals of Wales dates to 754. However, there is no other basis for the date and, as the records are quite sparse in this era, intervening kings cannot be precluded. The sole references to Caradog in the historical record are the appearance of his name in genealogies such as those in Jesus College MS. 20, and the entry of his death in the Annales Cambriae (Phillimore's year 798), noting he was killed (lit. "throat-slit") by the Anglo-Saxons (probably the Mercians).

It was during Caradog's reign that the Welsh church adopted the Catholic method of calculating Easter through the efforts of Bishop Elfodd in 768, thus removing a longstanding point of ecclesiastical contention. In 796, a battle occurred at Rhuddlan Marsh (Welsh: Morfa Rhuddlan) but neither the combatants nor the outcome is given. According to Brut Aberpergwm, a purported medieval Welsh text which was accepted as such by the editors of the Myvyrian Archaiology (but which is now known to be a forgery of Iolo Morganwg's), Caradog was slain in the 796 battle. Thomas Stephens was the first to doubt the text's authenticity.

The pedigree in Jesus College MS. 20 states that the later King Hywel (reigned c. 816 – c. 825) was Caradog's son, while historical works such as that by Lloyd say that Hywel was the son of Caradog's predecessor and the brother of his successor, King Cynan (reigned c. 798 – c. 816). Lloyd does not cite his sources for this assertion.

== Sources ==
- Davies, John (1990), A History of Wales (First ed.), London: Penguin Group (published 1993), ISBN 0-7139-9098-8
- Lloyd, John Edward (1911), A History of Wales from the Earliest Times to the Edwardian Conquest, vol. I (2nd ed.), London: Longmans, Green, and Co. (published 1912)
- Phillimore, Egerton, ed. (1887), "Pedigrees from Jesus College MS. 20", Y Cymmrodor, vol. VIII, Honourable Society of Cymmrodorion, pp. 77–92
- Phillimore, Egerton (1888), "The Annales Cambriae and Old Welsh Genealogies, from Harleian MS. 3859", in Phillimore, Egerton (ed.), Y Cymmrodor, vol. IX, Honourable Society of Cymmrodorion, pp. 141–183
- Stephens, Thomas (12 November 1857), "The Book of Aberpergwm, Improperly Called the Chronicle of Caradoc", Archaeologia Cambrensis, Third, vol. IV, London: Cambrian Archaeological Association (published 1858), pp. 77–96

Regnal titles
Preceded by Rhodri Molwynog	King of Gwynedd c. 754 – c. 798	Succeeded by Cynan Dindaethwy
