= Merfyn Frych =

King of Gwynedd from c. 826 to 844

Merfyn Frych ap Gwriad
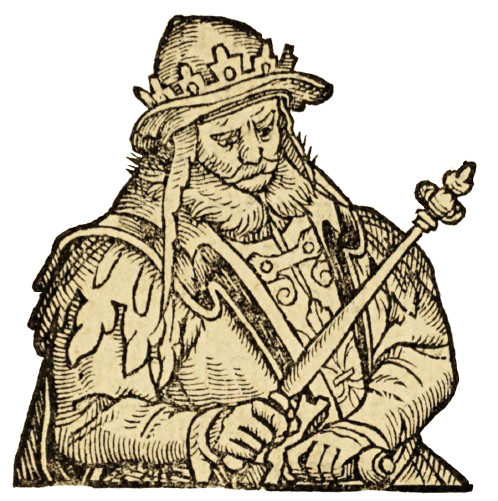
- A fanciful illustration of Merfyn Frych from the Historie of Cambria (1584)

King of Gwynedd
- Reign: c. 826–844
- Predecessor: Hywel Farf-fehinog
- Successor: Rhodri Mawr

King of the Isle of Man
- Reign: c. 800–844
- Predecessor: Gwriad ab Elidyr
- Successor: Rhodri Mawr
- Died: 844
- Spouse: Nest ferch Cadell
- Issue: Rhodri Mawr; Gwriad ap Merfyn; Anarawd ap Merfyn
- Dynasty: Coeling (allegedly, by birth); Merfynion (founder)
- Father: Gwriad ap Elidyr
- Mother: Esyllt ferch Cynan Dindaethwy

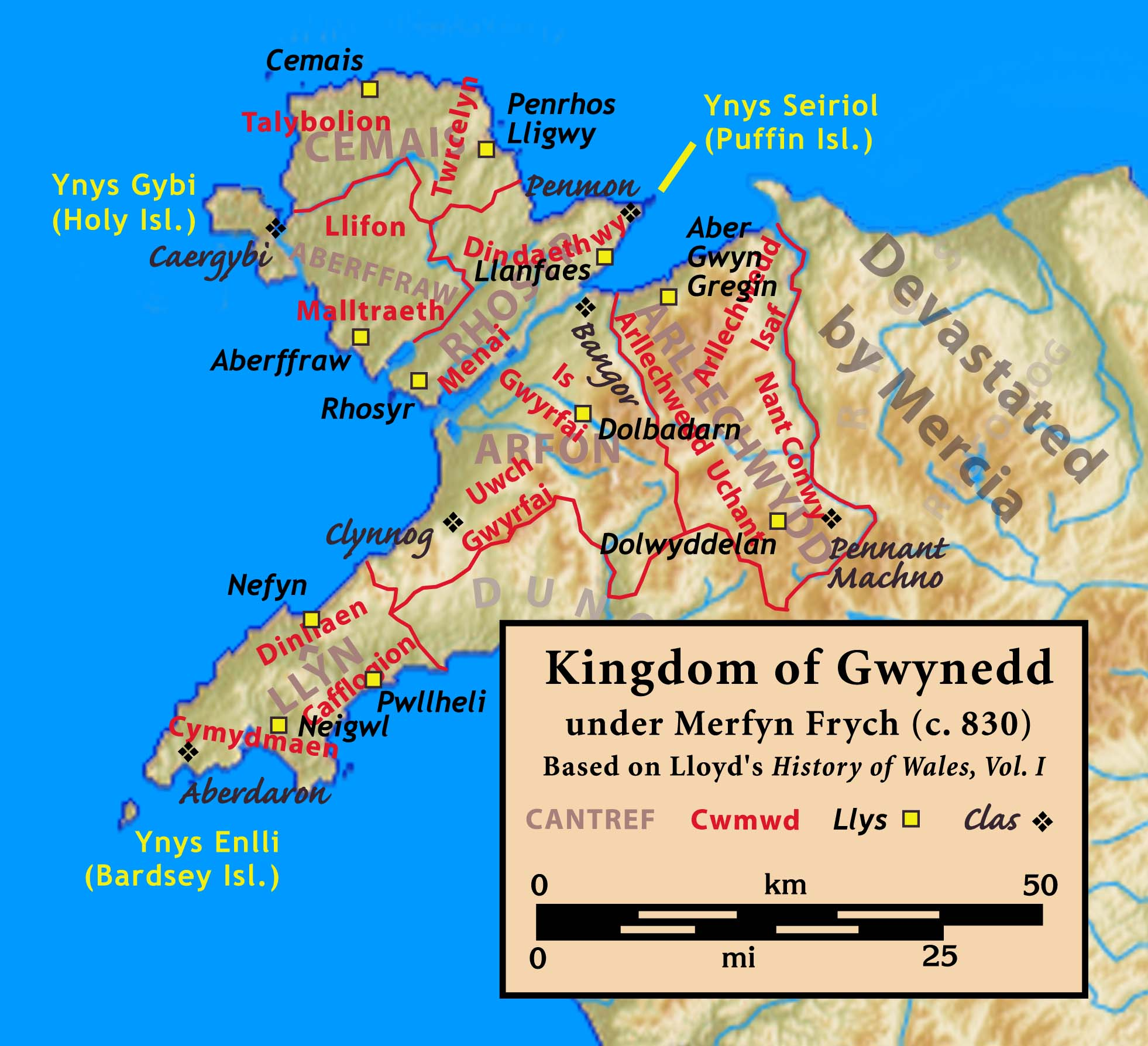
The Kingdom of Gwynedd under Merfyn Frych

Merfyn Frych ("Merfyn the Freckled"; Old Welsh Mermin), also known as Merfyn ap Gwriad ("Merfyn son of Gwriad") and Merfyn Camwri ("Merfyn the Oppressor"), was King of Gwynedd from around 826 to 844, the first of its kings known not to have descended from the male line of King Cunedda.

Little is known of his reign and his primary notability is as the father of Rhodri Mawr (Rhodri the Great) and founder of his dynasty, which was sometimes called the Merfynion after him. Merfyn came to the throne in the aftermath of a bloody dynastic struggle between two rivals named Cynan and Hywel – generally identified with the sons of Rhodri Molwynog.

The Annales Cambriae say Merfyn died around 844, the same year in which a battle occurred at Cetyll, but it is unclear whether those were two unrelated events or he fell in battle.

== Political background ==
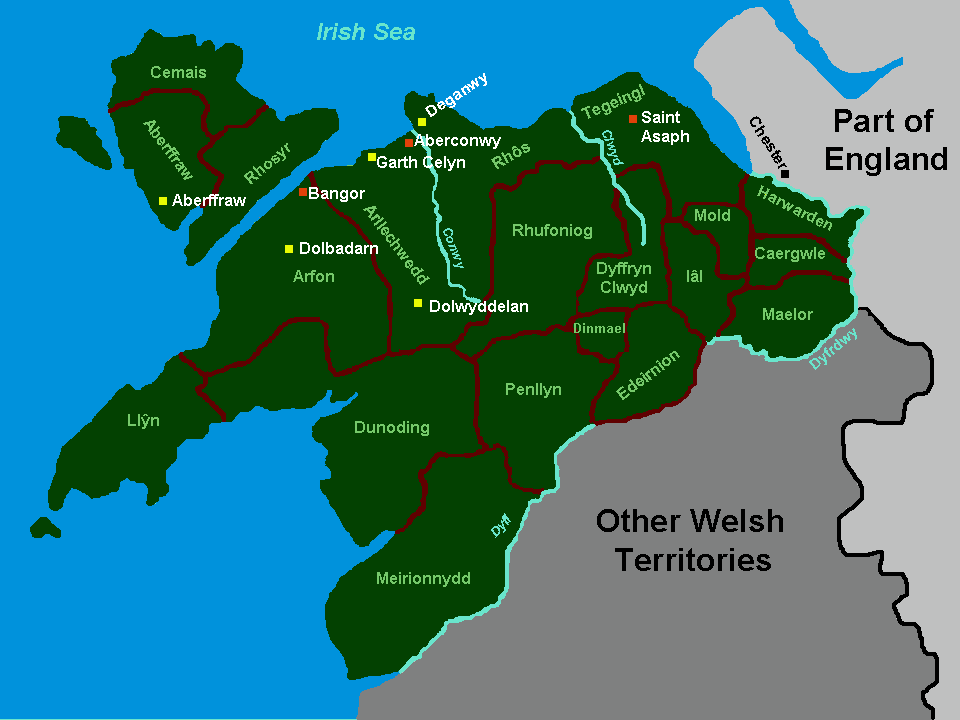
A general map of Gwynedd showing the cantrefi

The times leading up to Merfyn's reign were unsettled for both Gwynedd and neighbouring Powys. Both kingdoms were beset by internal dynastic strife, external pressure from Mercia, and bad luck with nature. In 810, there was a bovine plague that killed many cattle (the primary form of wealth at the time) throughout Wales. The next year, the ancient wooden llys at Deganwy was struck by lightning.

A destructive war for control of Gwynedd raged between 812 and 816, while in Powys a son of the king was killed by his brother "through treachery". In 818, there was a notable battle at Llanfaes on Anglesey. Although our sources do not identify the combatants, the site had been the llys of King Cynan.

Coenwulf of Mercia took advantage of the situation in 817, occupying Rhufoniog (see map) and laying waste to the mountains of Snowdonia. Coastal Wales along the Dee Estuary must have remained under Mercia's control through 821, as Coenwulf is recorded dying peacefully at Basingwerk in that year. In 823, Mercia laid waste to Powys and returned to Gwynedd to burn Deganwy to the ground. Gwynedd and Powys then gained a respite when Mercia's attention turned elsewhere and its fortunes waned.

King Beornwulf was killed fighting the East Anglians in 826, his successor Ludeca suffered the same fate the following year, and Mercia was conquered and occupied by Ecgberht of Wessex in 829. Though Mercia managed to throw off Ecgberht's rule in 830, it was thereafter beset by dynastic strife and never regarded its former dominance, either in Wales or eastern England.

== Family background and marriage ==
Merfyn was linked to the earlier dynasty through his mother Ethyllt ferch Cynan, the daughter of King Cynan Dindaethwy (d. 816), rather than through his father Gwriad ap Elidyr. (Note: There is nothing in what is known of Welsh law stating specifically that women were capable of transmitting legal title of kingship and it is not known whether Merfyn came to the throne through usurpation or prior arrangement. John Edward Lloyd's article on Merfyn in the Dictionary of National Biography says that claims of kingship through a maternal line were sometimes recognised under the Welsh law of inheritance and cites mamwys (English: maternity, heirship through the female line) for the justification. However, mamwys refers to matters of property.) As his father's origins are obscure, so is the basis of his claim to the throne.

Extremely little is known of Merfyn's father Gwriad. Merfyn claimed descent from Llywarch Hen through him, and the royal pedigree in Jesus College MS. 20 says that Gwriad was the son of Elidyr, who bears the same name as his ancestor, the father of Llywarch Hen, Elidyr Lydanwyn. Supporting the veracity of the pedigree is an entry in the Annales Cambriae, which states that Gwriad, the brother of Rhodri Mawr, was slain on Anglesey by the Saxons. That is to say, Merfyn named one of his sons after his father Gwriad.

The discovery of a cross inscribed Crux Guriat (English: Cross of Gwriad) on the Isle of Man and dated to the 8th or 9th century raised the question of whether Gwriad's possible connection to "Manaw" was to Manaw Gododdin, once active in North Britain, or to the Isle of Man (Welsh: Ynys Manaw). John Rhys suggested that Gwriad might well have taken refuge on the Isle of Man during the bloody dynastic struggle between Cynan and Hywel prior to Merfyn's accession to the throne and that the cross perhaps does refer to the refugee Gwriad, father of Merfyn. He goes on to note that the Welsh Triads mention a "Gwryat son of Gwryan in the North". Other locations for "Manaw" have been suggested, including Ireland, Galloway and Powys.

While Rhys's suggestion is not implausible, his reference to Gwriad's father Gwrian contradicts the royal pedigree, which says that Gwriad's father was Elidir, so this may be a confusion of two different people named Gwriad. Gwriad's name does appear with northern origins in the Welsh Triads as one of the "Three kings, who were of the sons of strangers" (sometimes referred to as the "Three Peasant Kings"), where he is identified as the son of "Gwrian in the North".

Merfyn allied his own royal family with that of Powys by marrying Nest, daughter or sister of King Cadell ap Brochfael, of the Royal House of Gwertherion. (Note: The view that Ethyllt was Merfyn's mother and Nest his wife is held by John Davies and many others, including David E. Thornton and John Edward Lloyd, who notes the consistency of the genealogies in Jesus College MS 20 and Harley MS 3859 against the contrary account that Nest was the mother and Ethyllt the wife. Thornton gives Nest as Cadell's sister.)

== Reign ==
Precious little is known of Merfyn's reign. Thornton suggests that Merfyn was probably among the Welsh kings who were defeated by Ecgberht, king of Wessex, in the year 830, but it is unknown how this affected Merfyn's rule.

Merfyn is mentioned as a king of the Britons in a copyist's addition (Note: Merfyn's name appears twice in the Historia Brittorum as "Mermin", with both mentions attributed to later additions to the Historia made in Gwynedd during Merfyn's reign. He is mentioned in a passage as quarto Meruini regis Britonum, and in another passage as ad annum quartum Mermini regis. In his History of Wales, Lloyd notes that this is the addition of a later copyist. Additionally, he notes that the text annum quartum Mermini regis does not appear in other copies of the Historia.) to the Historia Brittonum and in the Bamberg Cryptogram, (Note: The Bamberg Cryptogram was published with English annotation in 1892. It was discovered at Bamberg, Germany and it contains characters that must be translated from Greek numerals to Latin text using a key in order to read the message (a form of cryptogram), hence the document's name. It is accompanied by Latin text that names several medieval people of note, and includes the words Mermin Britannorum regis. This was written at the court of Merfyn during his reign.) but as both sources are traced to people working in Merfyn's own court during his reign, it should not be considered more significant than someone's respectful reference to his patron while working in his service.

In the literary sources, Merfyn's name appears in the Dialogue between Myrddin and his sister Gwenddydd (Welsh: Cyfoesi Myrddin a Gwenddydd ei Chwaer), found in the mid-13th century manuscript known as the Red Book of Hergest. The dialogue is a prophecy of the future kings, and lists among them Merfyn in the passage "meruin vrych o dir manaw" (English: Merfyn Frych of the land of Manau).

== Children ==
- Rhodri Mawr;
- Gwriad ap Merfyn;
- Anarawd ap Merfyn.

== See also ==
- List of rulers of Gwynedd
- Family tree of Welsh monarchs

== Sources ==
- "MERFYN FRYCH (died 844), king of Gwynedd". Dictionary of Welsh Biography. National Library of Wales.
- Davies, John (1990), A History of Wales (First ed.), London: Penguin Group (published 1993), ISBN 0-7139-9098-8
- Fraser, James E. (2009), From Caledonia to Pictland: Scotland to 795, New Edinburgh History of Scotland, vol. I, Edinburgh University Press, ISBN 978-0-7486-1232-1
- Kermode, Philip Moore Callow (1897), "A Welsh Inscription in the Isle of Man", in Meyer, Kuno; Stern, L. Chr. (eds.), Zeitschrift für celtische Philologie, vol. I, Halle: Max Niemeyer, pp. 48–53
- Kirby, D. P. (1991), "The Anglo-Saxon kingdoms in the first three-quarters of the ninth century", The Earliest English Kings (Revised ed.), New York: Routledge (published 2000), pp. 153–157, ISBN 0-415-24211-8
- Lloyd, John Edward (1894). "Merfyn Frych" . In Lee, Sidney (ed.). Dictionary of National Biography. Vol. 37. London: Smith, Elder & Co. p. 277.
- Lloyd, John Edward (1911), A History of Wales from the Earliest Times to the Edwardian Conquest, vol. I (2nd ed.), London: Longmans, Green, and Co. (published 1912)
- Nennius (c. 800), Stevenson, Joseph (ed.), Nennii Historia Britonum, London: English Historical Society (published 1838)
- Parry, Henry, ed. (1829), "Brut y Saeson", Archaeologia Cambrensis, Third, vol. IX, London: J. Russell Smith (published 1863), p. 63
- Phillimore, Egerton, ed. (1887), "Pedigrees from Jesus College MS. 20", Y Cymmrodor, vol. VIII, Honourable Society of Cymmrodorion, pp. 83–92
- Phillimore, Egerton (1888), "The Annales Cambriae and Old Welsh Genealogies, from Harleian MS. 3859", in Phillimore, Egerton (ed.), Y Cymmrodor, vol. IX, Honourable Society of Cymmrodorion, pp. 141–183
- Powel, David (1584). The historie of Cambria, now called Wales: a part of the most famous Yland of Brytaine, written in the Brytish language aboue two hundreth yeares past. Translated by Llwyd, Humphrey. London: Rafe Newberrie and Henrie Denham. IA historieofcambri00cara.
- Rhys, John (1897), "Note on Guriat", in Meyer, Kuno; Stern, L. Chr. (eds.), Zeitschrift für celtische Philologie, vol. I, Halle: Max Niemeyer, pp. 52–53
- Skene, William Forbes (1868a), The Four Ancient Books of Wales, vol. I, Edinburgh: Edmonston and Douglas (published 1868)
- Skene, William Forbes (1868b), The Four Ancient Books of Wales, vol. II, Edinburgh: Edmonston and Douglas (published 1868)
- Stokes, Whitley (18 July 1892), "On a Mediaeval Cryptogram", The Academy (July–December, 1892), vol. XLII, London: The Academy (published 1892), pp. 71–72
- Thornton, David E. (2004), "Merfyn Frych (d. 844)", Oxford Dictionary of National Biography, Oxford University Press

Merfyn Frych Merfynion Died: 844
Regnal titles
Preceded by Gwriad ab Elidyr	King of the Isle of Man c. 800–844	Succeeded by Rhodri Mawr
Preceded by Hywel Farf-fehinog	King of Gwynedd c. 826–844	Succeeded by Rhodri Mawr
