= Nest ferch Cadell =

- Spouse: Merfyn Frych
- Issue: Rhodri the Great
- Father: Cadell ap Brochfael

Nest ferch Cadell was the daughter of Cadell ap Brochfael, an 8th-century King of Powys. She married Merfyn Frych, King of Gwynedd.

On the death of her brother King Cyngen ap Cadell in 855, authority over the Kingdom of Powys was claimed by Rhodri the Great, who had previously inherited the Kingdom of Gwynedd on the death of his father in 844. Rhodri thus united the Kingdoms of Powys and Gwynedd. Traditionally, Nest was claimed to be Rhodri's mother, hence his claim to Powys would have been matrilineal.

However, it is unclear why the inheritance of Powys would have passed through Nest to her son and not to one of the sons of Cyngen: Elisedd ap Cyngen, Ieuaf ap Cyngen, Aeddan ap Cyngen and Gruffudd ap Cyngen. The texts of Welsh laws which survive until today were written down starting with the 12th century, but they provide no evidence that women were capable of transmitting legal title of kingship or lordship.

Equally, although Rhodri's pedigree in a manuscript in Jesus College Oxford states Nest as his mother, another pedigree in a fourteenth-century manuscript in the National Library of Wales records his mother as Esyllt ferch Cynan. There are no strong grounds to accept either manuscript as reliable, but it is reasonable to believe that the royal house of Gwynedd promoted the view that the Kingdom of Powys had passed to Rhodri the Great through his mother in order to legitimise their control over it. Either way, this possible genealogical manipulation became part of the accepted story of the unification of the two kingdoms.

Most now take Nest ferch Cadell to be the Nest who was married to Gwerstan, son of Gwaithfoed, whose grandson Bleddyn founded Powys's ruling House of Mathrafal. Rhodri's mother is instead taken to be Esylt daughter of Cynan Dindaethwy, last King of the House of Cunedda; it follows that Esylt was not Merfyn's mother, but his wife. Consequently, those taking this view conclude that Nest's alleged marriage to Merfyn (or Rhodri) was merely a rumour spread and recorded by supporters of Gwynedd to demean the Kings of Powys and to claim lordship over them. The House of Gwynedd's Kingship is recorded being passed jure uxoris through Esylt to her husband Merfyn and thence distaff (i.e. by the female line) to their son Rhodri on Merfyn's death, the same going for Rhodri's wife Angharad, the daughter of Meurig King of Seisyllwg when her brother Gwgon drowned without an heir, allowing Rhodri to rule Seisyllwg jure uxoris and his son Cadell to inherit it matrilineally.

== See also ==
- Kings of Wales family trees
