= Hywel Fychan =

This variant name form has been identified as relating to two different people:

- In the ninth century this is the same as Hywel ap Rhodri Molwynog
- In the fourteenth century the name appears as the grandfather of Dafydd Gam
