= Anwn Ddu =

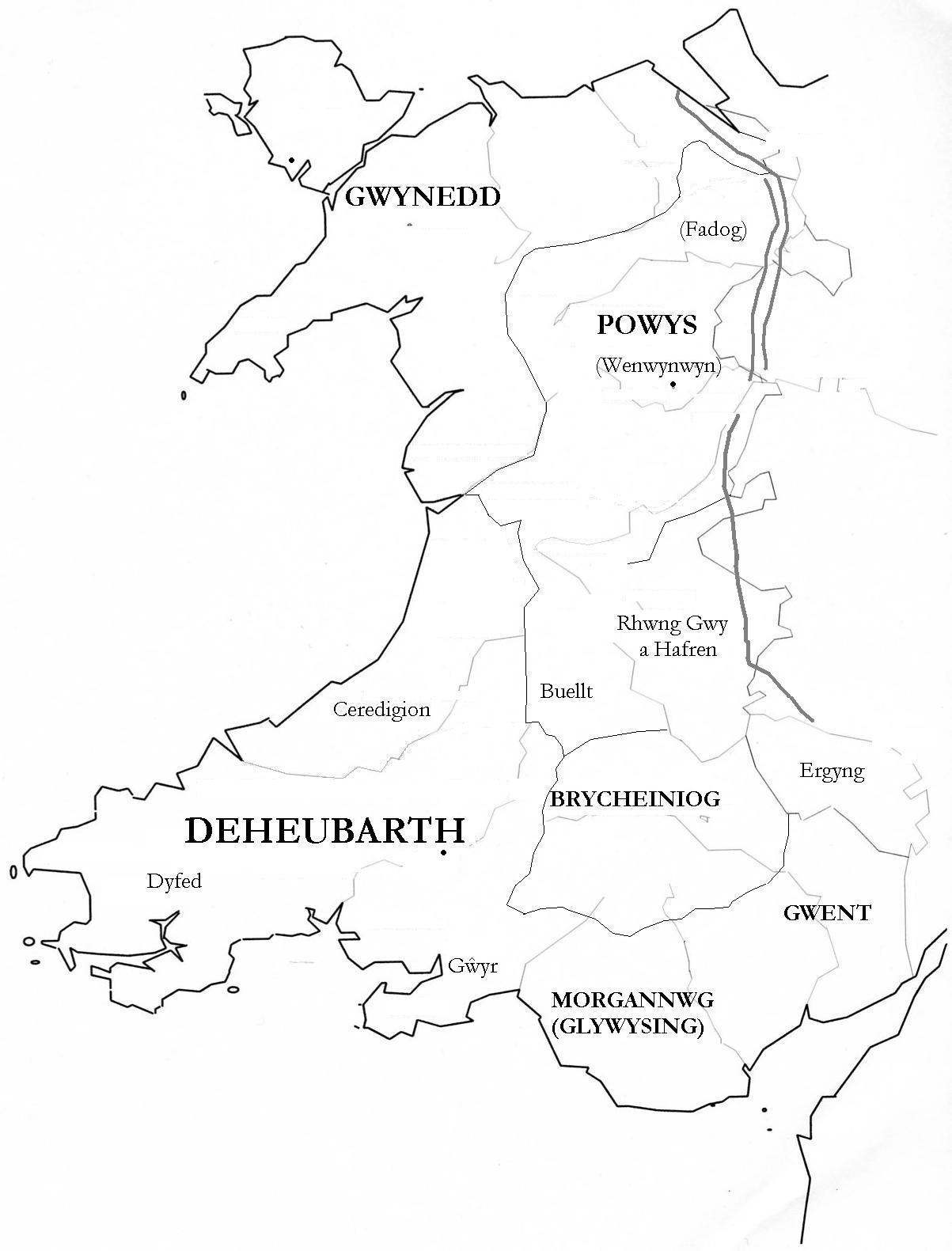
Kingdoms of medieval Wales, including Brycheiniog

Annun Ddu (Welsh for Antonius the Black, born c. 200) is a legendary figure in medieval Welsh genealogical and historical traditions. He has been described as an ancestor of Brychan, founder of the kingdom of Brycheiniog.

According to the genealogies, Brychan was son of Marchell, daughter of Tewdrig, son of Teithfall, son of Teithrin, son of Tathal, son of Annun Ddu. Annun is called 'king of the Greeks'; De Situ Brecheniauc calls him Anhun rex Grecorum, Cognatio Brychan calls him Annun niger regis Grecorum and Genealogies from Jesus College MS 20 call him Annwn du vrenhin Groec. According to a 17th century story (Historie of Brecon), his son Tathal came to Britain from Greece and married Morfudd, daughter of Gwroldeg, king of Garthmadrun, and established a line of princes of Garthmadrun, ending with Tewdrig, whose daughter Marchell married an Irish prince called Anlach and became the mother of Brychan. Garthmadrun was subsequently renamed Brycheiniog. According to Eoin MacNeill, Brychan may be descended from the Uí Liatháin, who settled parts of Wales along with the Déisi.

He is also mentioned in the Harleian genealogies in a list of Roman emperors between Valerian and Aurelian. Here are mentioned Antun du & Cleopatre, which is, according to historian Peter Bartrum, a 'learned addition', identifying Annun Ddu with Roman politician Mark Antony. Since Mark Antony ruled eastern part of the Roman Empire, this identification may be the origin of Annun's title 'king of the Greeks'.

Another Annun Ddu (born c. 445) is found in Bonedd y Saint and he is described as a son of Emyr Llydaw and a father of St Tydecho. Iolo Morganwg identifies him with Amon, a noble from Dyfed and a father of St Samson.

== See also ==
- List of rulers in Wales
