= Rhodri Molwynog =

King of Gwynedd from c. 720 to c. 754

Rhodri Molwynog ab Idwal Iwrch
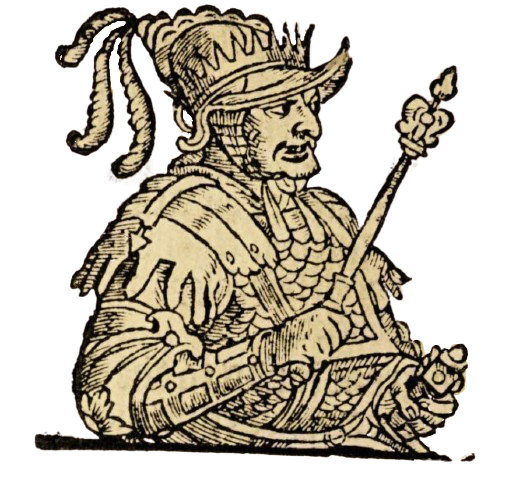
- A fanciful illustration of Rhodri Molwynog from the Historie of Cambria (1584)

King of Gwynedd
- Reign: c. 720 - c. 754
- Died: c. 754
- Issue: Cynan Dindaethwy
- House: Maelgyning
- Father: Idwal Iwrch

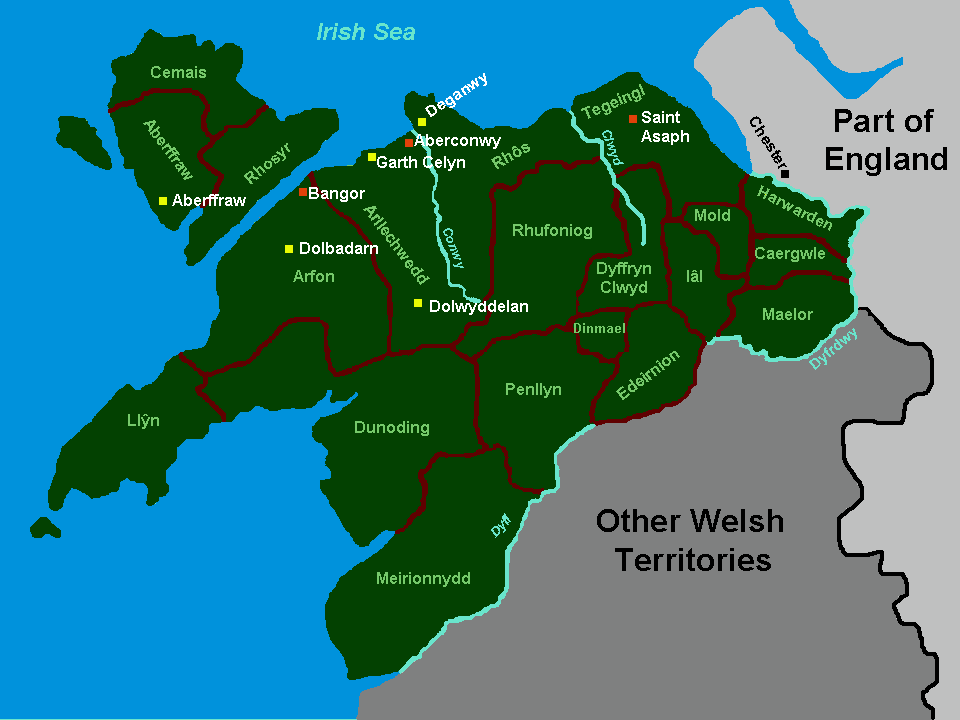
A map of Gwynedd showing its cantrefi

Rhodri Molwynog ab Idwal Iwrch ("Rhodri the Bald and Grey"; reigned c. 720 – c. 754, died circa 754), was an 8th century king of Gwynedd. He was listed as a King of the Britons by the Annals of Wales.

This era in the history of Gwynedd is very obscure and, given the lack of reliable information available, several serious histories of medieval Wales – including John Davies's – do not mention Rhodri at all, while others – including John Lloyd's – mention him only in passing, quoting the undated entry of the Annals of Wales recording his death. Phillimore's reconstruction places the entry in the year 754. The Annals do not mention the death of an earlier king within a reasonable time frame, so the date that he became king is not known, nor is the name of his predecessor.

Rhodri's name also appears in genealogies such as those in Jesus College MS. 20 (where he is described as the son of Idwal Iwrch son of Cadwaladr Fendigiad) and the Harleian genealogies (where he is described as the son of Tutgual son of Cadwaladr). It remains, however, unclear to what extent the genealogies at that point were recording the lineage of the Cuneddion dynasty regardless of their rule or recording the rulers regardless of their connection to the main branch of the dynasty.

The Annals of Wales mention a war in kingdom of Cornwall around 722 without giving the names of the individuals involved. The Brut y Saeson Chronicle says that in 721 there was "an extensive war between Rhodri Molwynawg and the Saxons in Cornwall". The Brut Aberpergwm also recorded this event but, while it was accepted for a time by the editors of The Myvyrian Archaiology of Wales, Thomas Stephens has since shown that it was one of Iolo Morganwg's many forgeries.

The Rotri appearing in the Annals has sometimes been misidentified as a ruler of Alt Clut (modern Dumbarton Rock), the Brythonic kingdom later known as Strathclyde.

He was succeeded by Caradog ap Meirion.

== See also ==
- Kings of Gwynedd
- Family tree of Welsh monarchs

== Sources ==
- Davies, John (1990), A History of Wales (First ed.), London: Penguin Group (published 1993), ISBN 0-7139-9098-8
- Lloyd, John Edward (1911), A History of Wales from the Earliest Times to the Edwardian Conquest, vol. I (2nd ed.), London: Longmans, Green, and Co. (published 1912)
- MacQuarrie, Alan (1993), A. Grant; K. Stringer (eds.), "The Kings of Strathclyde", Medieval Scotland: Crown, Lordship and Community, Edinburgh University Press: 1–19.
- Owen, Aneurin, ed. (1841), Ancient Laws and Institutes of Wales, vol. I
- Parry, Henry, ed. (1829), "Brut y Saeson", Archaeologia Cambrensis, Third Series, vol. IX, London: J. Russell Smith (published 1863), pp. 59–67
- Phillimore, Egerton, ed. (1887), "Pedigrees from Jesus College MS. 20", Y Cymmrodor, vol. VIII, Honourable Society of Cymmrodorion, pp. 77–92
- Phillimore, Egerton (1888), "The Annales Cambriæ and Old Welsh Genealogies, from Harleian MS. 3859", in Phillimore, Egerton (ed.), Y Cymmrodor, vol. IX, Honourable Society of Cymmrodorion, pp. 141–183
- Powel, David (1584). The historie of Cambria, now called Wales: a part of the most famous Yland of Brytaine, written in the Brytish language aboue two hundreth yeares past. Translated by Llwyd, Humphrey. London: Rafe Newberrie and Henrie Denham. IA historieofcambri00cara.
- Stephens, Thomas (12 November 1857), "The Book of Aberpergwm, Improperly Called the Chronicle of Caradoc", Archaeologia Cambrensis, Third, vol. IV, London: Cambrian Archaeological Association (published 1858), pp. 77–96

Regnal titles
Preceded by Idwal Iwrch	King of Gwynedd c. 720 – c. 754	Succeeded by Caradog ap Meirion
