= Gruffydd ap Cyngen =

Gruffydd ap Cyngen (died c. 814) was a prince of Powys in Wales of the Early Middle Ages. His father Cyngen ap Cadell was the last king of Powys from the old Cadelling dynasty descended from Vortigern.

Gruffydd died before the realm was lost to the family of Rhodri the Great, however. He is recorded in the Welsh histories as having been treacherously slain by his brother Elisedd.
