= Hubert Lewis (jurist) =

British barrister and jurist (1825–1884)

Hubert Lewis (1825–1884) was a British barrister and jurist, now known for his historical work The Ancient Laws of Wales published in 1889.

== Early life ==
Born on 23 March 1825, he was the second son of Walter Clapham Lewis of Upper Norland House, Kensington. He was educated privately, and in December 1844, entered Emmanuel College, Cambridge, where he obtained a scholarship, and graduated B.A. in 1848. His father's will of 1865 gives his residence as Ripon.

== Career ==
Lewis entered the Middle Temple in May 1851, and was called to the bar in 1854. He practised conveyancing and equity law, first at Bradford, where he went the northern circuit and attended the West Riding sessions, and subsequently in London.

== Death ==
Lewis died unmarried on 6 March 1884 at Margate, and was buried in the cemetery there.

== Works ==
The Ancient Laws of Wales, 1889, was published posthumously under the editorship of John Edward Lloyd. This labour of love was intended to show that the English constitution and law of real property were largely based on early British institutions. Lewis argued from material found in the Laws of Hywel Dda and The Record of Caernarvon (i.e. Harleian Manuscripts 696), the evidence of place-names, and questionable etymological reasoning. Thomas Jones Pierce wrote in the Dictionary of Welsh Biography that "The value of this work as a pioneer study in Welsh jurisprudence - and particularly as an attempt at a comparative study of institutions - has never been adequately appreciated."

Huw Pryce wrote:

This editorial work compelled Lloyd to immerse himself in Welsh law: as he later recalled, 'I gave a great deal of time to it when I was at Aberystwyth and found that it had endless ramifications'.

Lloyd himself later dismissed Lewis's treatment

as largely worthless, which may explain why, c.1898, he started to write a book of his own [...]

Lewis was also the author of:

- Principles of Conveyancing, 1863.
- Principles of Equity Drafting, 1865

The sixth edition of George Goldsmith's The Doctrine and Practice of Equity'', was almost entirely rewritten by Lewis in 1870. He left in manuscript works on "Local Nomenclature" and related topics.
