= Hywel Farf-fehinog =

King of Gwynedd from c. 816 to c. 825

Hywel ap Caradog or Hywel Farf-fehinog (Hywel Greasy-beard) was King of Gwynedd (reigned c. 816 – c. 825). He rose to power following a destructive dynastic struggle in which he deposed King Cynan Dindaethwy (reigned c. 798 – c. 816). During Hywel's reign, Gwynedd's power was largely confined to Anglesey. It was a time of substantial territorial loss to Mercia.

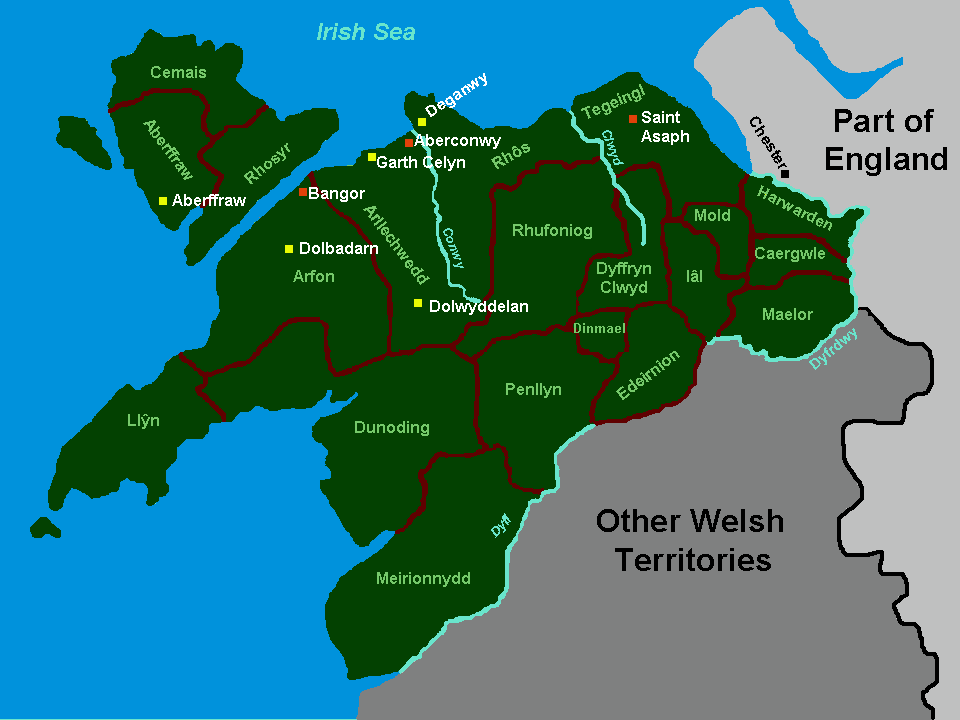
A general map of Gwynedd showing the cantrefi

Hywel was said to be the son of Rhodri Molwynog on the assumption that he was Cynan's brother, for example as stated in John Edward Lloyd's History of Wales, which does not cite its source. Sources such as the Annales Cambriae mention him by name only. The genealogy from Jesus College MS. 20 gives him as the son of Caradog ap Meirion, while it gives Cynan as the son of Rhodri Molwynog.

A destructive war between King Cynan and Hywel raged on Anglesey between 812 and 816, ultimately ending with Cynan's defeat and banishment, and Hywel's rise to the throne. Coenwulf of Mercia took advantage of Gwynedd's weakness in 817, occupying Rhufoniog (see map) and laying waste to the mountains of Eryri (English: Snowdonia), the defensive stronghold of Gwynedd. In 818 there was a notable battle at Llanfaes on Anglesey. The combatants are not identified, but the site had been the llys (English: royal court) of King Cynan. (Note: Various historical works assume it was an invasion by the Mercians, by Ecgberht of Wessex, or by the Vikings, but there is no authority for those claims. As it took place at Cynan's llys, it could as easily have been a consequence of the dynastic struggle won by Hywel, but now between Hywel and Cynan's supporters.)

Coastal Wales along the Dee Estuary was still in Mercian hands in 821, as it is known that Coenwulf died peacefully at Basingwerk in that year. In 823 Mercia laid waste to Powys and returned to Gwynedd to burn down Deganwy.

Hywel was the last King of Gwynedd in the male line of Maelgwn Gwynedd. He would be succeeded by his brother's grandson Merfyn Frych.

== See also ==
- Family tree of Welsh monarchs

== Sources ==
- Davies, John (1990), A History of Wales (First ed.), London: Penguin Group (published 1993), ISBN 0-7139-9098-8
- Lloyd, John Edward (1911), A History of Wales from the Earliest Times to the Edwardian Conquest, vol. I (2nd ed.), London: Longmans, Green, and Co. (published 1912)
- Owen, Aneurin, ed. (1841), Ancient Laws and Institutes of Wales, vol. I
- Parry, Henry (1829), "Brut y Saeson", in Parry, Henry (ed.), Archaeologia Cambrensis, Third, vol. IX, London: J. Russell Smith (published 1863), p. 63
- Phillimore, Egerton, ed. (1887), "Pedigrees from Jesus College MS. 20", Y Cymmrodor, vol. VIII, Honourable Society of Cymmrodorion, pp. 77–92
- Phillimore, Egerton (1888), "The Annales Cambriae and Old Welsh Genealogies, from Harleian MS. 3859", in Phillimore, Egerton (ed.), Y Cymmrodor, vol. IX, Honourable Society of Cymmrodorion, pp. 141–183
- Reeves, William, ed. (1857), "Additional Notes (Chronicon Hyense)", The Life of St. Columba, to which are added Copious Notes and Dissertations, Dublin: Irish Archaeological and Celtic Society, pp. 369–413
- Skene, William Forbes, ed. (1867), Chronicles of the Picts, Chronicles of the Scots, and Other Early Memorials of Scottish History, Edinburgh: Edinburgh General Register House

Regnal titles
Preceded by Cynan Dindaethwy ap Rhodri	King of Gwynedd c. 816 – c. 825	Succeeded by Merfyn Frych
