= Eluned Garmon Jones =

Welsh local historian (1897 – 1979)

Eluned Clunes Garmon Jones (née Lloyd, 1897 – 1979) was a Welsh local historian.

She was born Eluned Clunes Lloyd in Bangor in November 1897 to historian John Edward Lloyd and his wife Clementina, née Miller. She was affectionately known as Lin. Like her brother Edward, Eluned studied at the University of Oxford, where she encouraged the talents of her classmate Margaret Kennedy. She received a BA from Somerville College in 1920 at the first degree ceremony to award degrees to women there.

An authority on local history and the place-names of Wales, Lloyd was Tutor and Internal Examiner in Modern History at the University of Liverpool.

In 1923, she married her colleague William Garmon Jones. She moved back to Bangor in 1945, and died in 1979.
