= Dindaethwy =

Welsh medieval commote

Coordinates: 53.258°N 4.130°W

Dindaethwy was in medieval times one of two commotes of the cantref of Rhosyr, in the south-east of the Isle of Anglesey. It was between the Menai Strait and Conwy Bay (to the south), and the Irish Sea and Red Wharf Bay (to the north).

It included Penmon, the easternmost point of the island, opposite which is Puffin Island (Ynys Seiriol). It bordered the commote of Menai (the other commote of Rhosyr) to the west, and the commote of Twrcelyn in the cantref of Cemais, to the north.

The commote court and maerdref was at Llanfaes, the commote's most important settlement. Later in the Middle Ages, Llywelyn the Great founded a monastery at Llanfaes; his wife Siwan was buried there. Previously the commote had one of Anglesey's two most important religious communities in Penmon, which became a priory (Penmon Priory) in the 12th century.

Later, Dindaethwy was the home of Penmynydd, the family estate of the Tudors of Anglesey.

The name means "Fort of the Daethwy", which may refer to the hillfort of Bwrdd Arthur ("Arthur's Table") in the former parish of Llanfihangel Din Sylwy. The Daethwy were the local Celtic tribe, who also gave their name to the village of Porthaethwy (Menai Bridge). Alternative names are Tindaethwy and Tyndaethwy (Dindaethwy may be a lenited version of Tindaethwy). The fort of Dinas, in the parish of Llandysilio, may have been the tribal centre.

The word Dindaethwy also appears in the name of Cynan Dindaethwy, king of Gwynedd at the start of the 9th century, as he was from this part of Anglesey.
