= Llanfihangel Din Sylwy =

Parish in Anglesey, Wales

Coordinates: 53.3116°N 4.1208°W

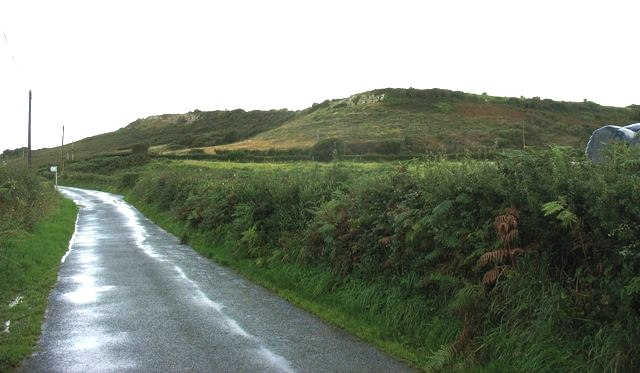
Southern scarp of Bwrdd Arthur

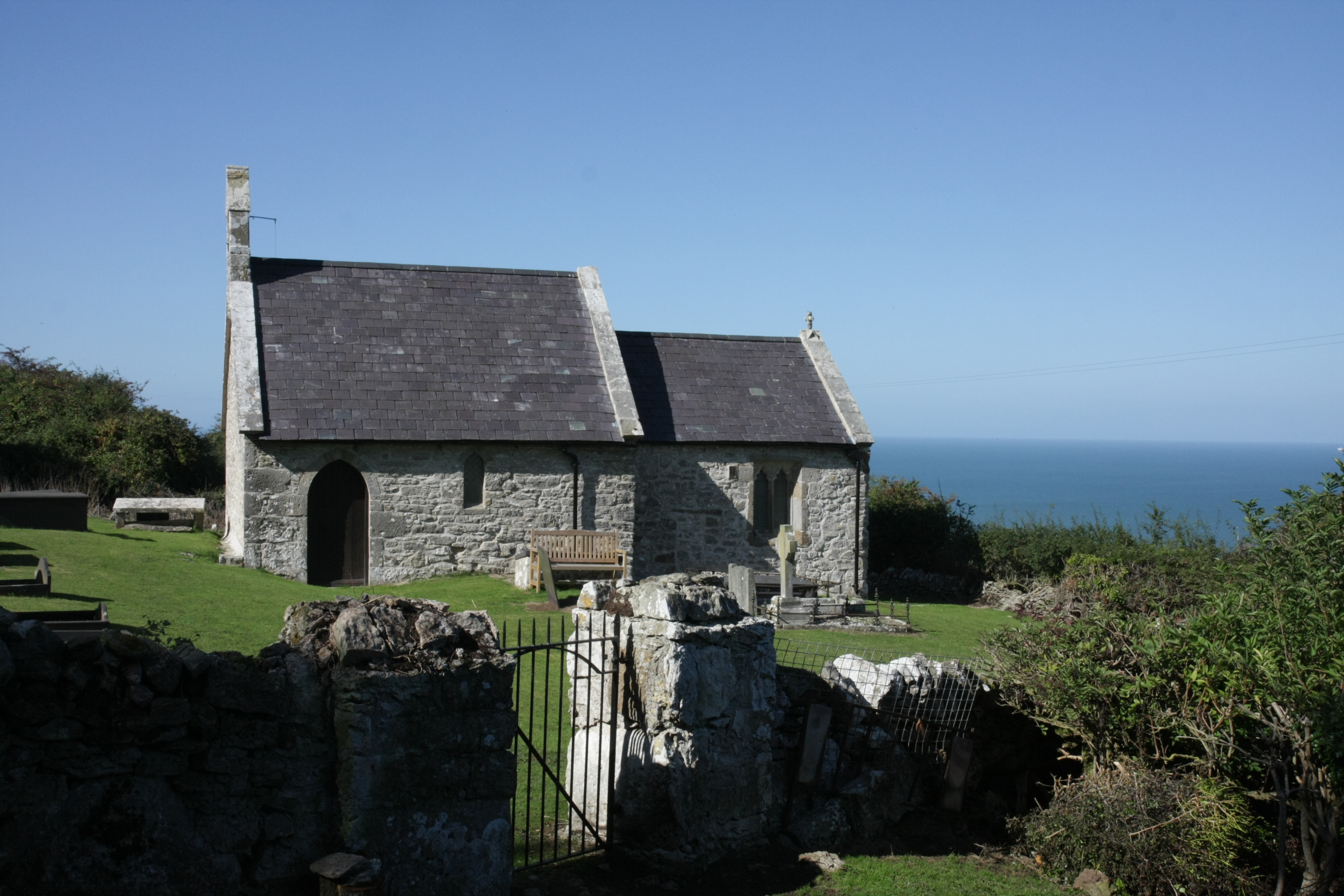
St Michael's church

Llanfihangel Din Sylwy (spelling variants include Llanfihangel Din Silwy and Llanfihangel Tyn Sylwy) is a small, coastal (former) parish in the commote of Dindaethwy in north-east Anglesey, three miles north-northwest of Beaumaris.

A scattered settlement, it is distinguished by a hillfort known as Din Sylwy or Bwrdd Arthur and by a late medieval church dedicated to St. Michael (Welsh: Mihangel). The hillfort constitutes a relatively flat but partly overgrown area, 600 yards from the Irish Sea. Two entrances have been detected. The small fifteenth-century church consists of a simple nave and chancel and preserves a number of original features.

== See also ==
- List of Scheduled Monuments in Anglesey
- List of hillforts in Wales

== Sources ==
- Anglesey: A survey and Inventory by the Royal Commission on Ancient and Historical Monuments in Wales and Monmouthshire, 1937, reprinted 1968.
- "Church of St Michael, Llanddona". British Listed Buildings.
