= Galwyddel =

Sub-Roman Kingdom

Kingdom of Galwyddel
- Late 400s–c.550
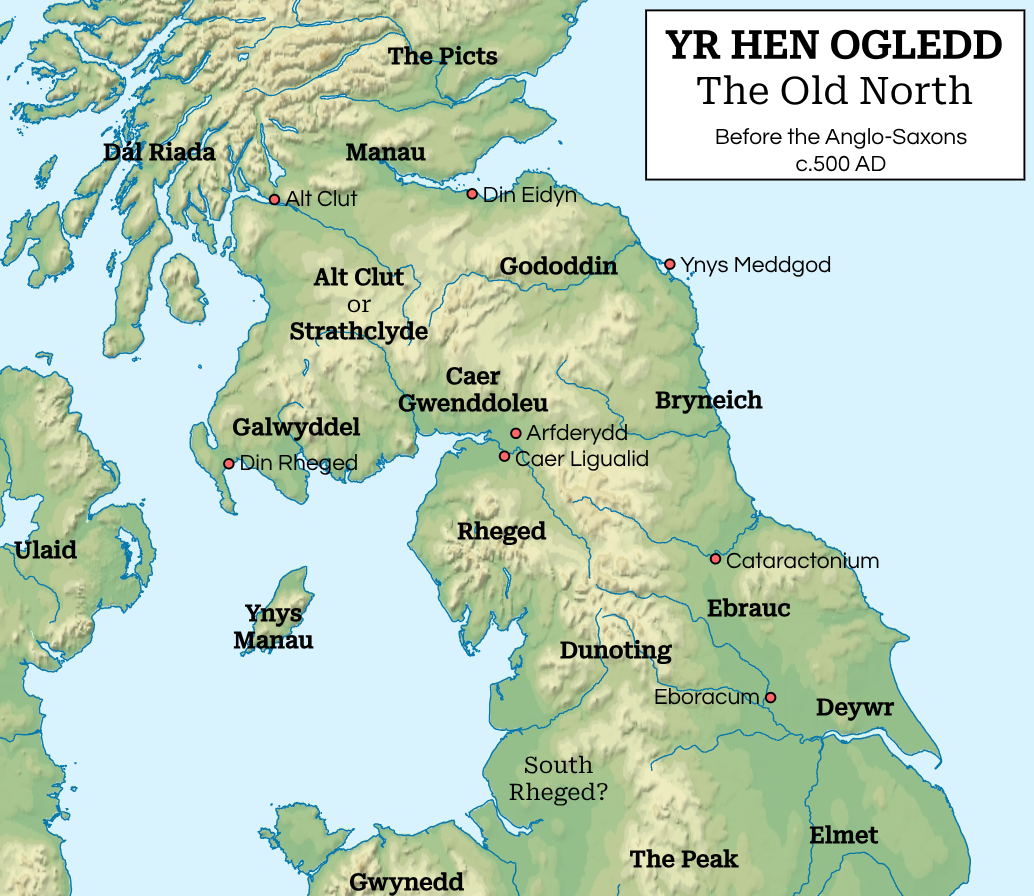
- The Hen Ogledd
- Other languages: Common Brythonic
- Government: Monarchy
- King
  - Late 400s─Early 500s: Tudwal ap Cinuit
  - Early 500s─Mid 500s: Dingat ap Tudwal
  - Mid 500s─c.550: Senyllt ap Dingat
- History
  - Established: Late 400s
  - Death of Cinuit of Alt Clut: Late 400s
  - Invasion by Urien of Rheged: c.550
Preceded by	Succeeded by
Kingdom of Alt Clut	Kingdom of Rheged; Ynys Manau
- Today part of: Scotland; Isle of Man

Galwyddel was a Brythonic kingdom within the Hen Ogledd ("Old North") in Sub-Roman Britain. Its area corresponds to modern-day Galloway, Scotland. Galwyddel is believed to have split from the Kingdom of Alt Clut following the death of King Cinuit and his land's division between his sons: Dyfnwal Hen (who became King of Alt Clut); and Tudwal (who became the first King of Galwyddel). Galwyddel is believed to have maintained authority over the Isle of Man. Around 550, Galwyddel was invaded and annexed by the Kingdom of Rheged, under King Urien. The Galwyddel King, Senyllt, was forced to flee to Ynys Manau (Isle of Man).

== Kings of Galwyddel ==
Name (Birth–death)	Reign		Note	Royal house
Name (Birth–death)	Reign start	Reign end	Note	Royal house
Tutgual I b. c.467	Late 400s	Early 500s	Son of Cinuit, King of Alt Clut; Brother of Dynfwal Hen of Alt Clut	House of Alt Clut
Dingat b. late 400s	Early 500s	Mid 500s	Son of Tutgual of Galwyddel	House of Alt Clut
Senyllt b. c.510	Mid 500s	c.550	Son of Dingat ap Tudwal; Exiled to Ynys Manau	House of Alt Clut
