= Cynan Dindaethwy =

King of Gwynedd from c. 798 to c. 816

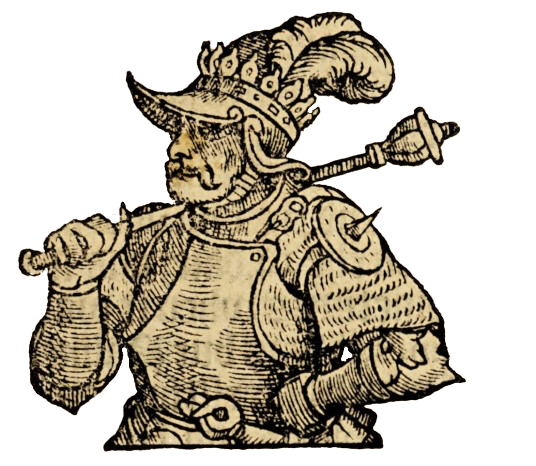
- A fanciful illustration of Cynan Dindaethwy from the Historie of Cambria (1584)

King of Gwynedd
- Reign: c. 798 – c. 816
- Died: c. 816
- Issue: Esyllt ferch Cynan Dindaethwy
- House: Gwynedd
- Father: Rhodri Molwynog

Cynan Dindaethwy (English: "Cynan of Dindaethwy") or Cynan ap Rhodri ("Cynan son of Rhodri") was a king of Gwynedd (reigned c. 798 – c. 816) in Wales in the early Middle Ages. Cynan was the son of Rhodri Molwynog and ascended to the throne of Gwynedd upon the death of King Caradog ap Meirion in 798. His epithet refers to the commote of Dindaethwy in the cantref Rhosyr. Unlike later kings of Gwynedd, usually resident at Aberffraw in western Anglesey, Cynan maintained his court at Llanfaes on the southeastern coast. Cynan's reign was marked by a destructive dynastic power struggle with a rival named Hywel ap Caradog, usually supposed to be his brother. (One source, the genealogy in Jesus College MS. 20, gives him as the son of Caradog ap Meirion, hence "ap Caradog".)

Rhodri died in 754, but there is no mention of Cynan until 813; thus it is suggested in Y Bywgraffiadur Cymreig that there is an error in his pedigree. It is said that he and Caradog may have been cousins. Another possibility is that his epithet refers to Castell Dindaethwy, believed to have been on a hill near Menai Bridge, which provides some confirmation that he came from the south east of Anglesey.

== Cynan's reign and aftermath ==
There is no historical record of Cynan's early years as king, but his reign ended in a combination of natural disasters and military reverses. In 810, there was a bovine plague that killed many cattle throughout Wales. The next year Deganwy, the ancient wooden court of Maelgwn Gwynedd, was struck by lightning.

A destructive war between Cynan and Hywel raged on Anglesey between 812 and 816, ultimately ending with Cynan's defeat and banishment. Cynan and Hywel are said to be brothers in historical works such as John Edward Lloyd's History of Wales, although Lloyd does not cite its source. The Annals of Wales mention the pair only by name, without any title, relation, or patronym. (In comparison, it takes care to point out the brotherly nature of Elisedd's slaughter of Gruffydd ap Cyngen in Powys around the same time.) The genealogies from Jesus College MS 20 deny Cynan and Hywel were brothers at all, instead making Hywel the son of Caradog ap Meirion and a distant cousin of Cynan Dindaethwy son of Rhodri Molwynog. The Harleian genealogies agree with this. Cynan died within a year of his exile according to the Annals of Wales and the Irish Annals.

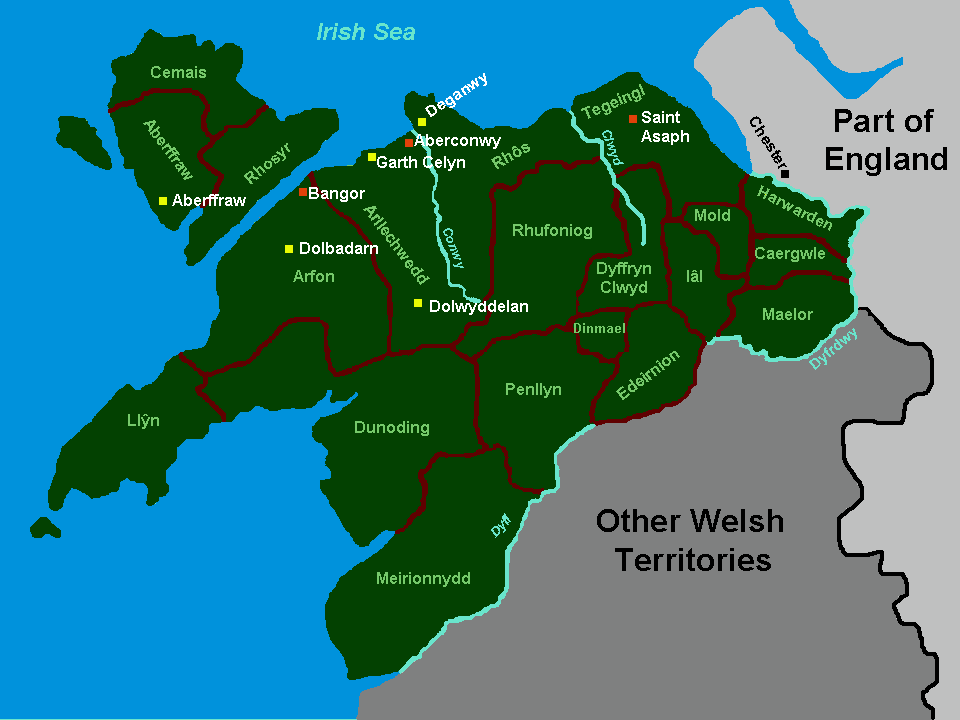
A map of Gwynedd showing its traditional cantrefs

After Cynan's death, there was a battle at his former court at Llanfaes on Anglesey noted by the chronicles, but the combatants are not identified. (Note: Various historical works assume it was an invasion by the Mercians, by Ecgberht of Wessex, or by the Vikings, but there is no authority for those claims. As it took place at Cynan's court, it could as easily have been a struggle between Hywel and remnants of Cynan's supporters.)

Cynan's daughter Esyllt became the mother of Merfyn Frych ap Gwriad, the first King of Gwynedd (c. 825 – c. 844) known not to have descended from the male line of Cunedda and father of Rhodri Mawr.

== See also ==
- Family tree of Welsh monarchs

== Sources ==
- Davies, John (1990), A History of Wales (First ed.), London: Penguin Group (published 1993), ISBN 0-7139-9098-8
- Lloyd, John Edward (1911), A History of Wales from the Earliest Times to the Edwardian Conquest, vol. I (2nd ed.), London: Longmans, Green, and Co. (published 1912)
- Owen, Aneurin, ed. (1841), Ancient Laws and Institutes of Wales, vol. I
- Parry, Henry, ed. (1829), "Brut y Saeson", Archaeologia Cambrensis, Third, vol. IX, London: J. Russell Smith (published 1863), pp. 59–67
- Phillimore, Egerton, ed. (1887), "Pedigrees from Jesus College MS. 20", Y Cymmrodor, vol. VIII, Honourable Society of Cymmrodorion, pp. 77–92
- Phillimore, Egerton (1888), "The Annales Cambriæ and Old Welsh Genealogies, from Harleian MS. 3859", in Phillimore, Egerton (ed.), Y Cymmrodor, vol. IX, Honourable Society of Cymmrodorion, pp. 141–183
- Powel, David (1584). The historie of Cambria, now called Wales: a part of the most famous Yland of Brytaine, written in the Brytish language aboue two hundreth yeares past. Translated by Llwyd, Humphrey. London: Rafe Newberrie and Henrie Denham. IA historieofcambri00cara.
- Reeves, William, ed. (1857), "Additional Notes (Chronicon Hyense)", The Life of St. Columba, to which are added Copious Notes and Dissertations, Dublin: Irish Archaeological and Celtic Society, pp. 369–413
- Skene, William Forbes, ed. (1867), Chronicles of the Picts, Chronicles of the Scots, and Other Early Memorials of Scottish History, Edinburgh: Edinburgh General Register House

Regnal titles
Preceded by Caradog ap Meirion	King of Gwynedd c. 798 – c. 816	Succeeded by Hywel ap Caradog
