= Esyllt ferch Cynan Dindaethwy =

Princess of Gwynedd

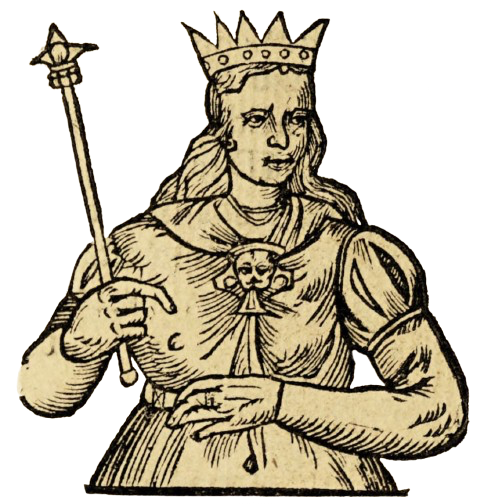
- A fanciful illustration of Esyllt from the Historie of Cambria (1584)
- Spouse: Gwriad ap Elidyr
- Issue: Merfyn Frych ap Gwriad
- Dynasty: First Dynasty of Gwynedd
- Father: Cynan Dindaethwy ap Rhodri

Esyllt ferch Cynan Dindaethwy was an eighth century princess of the Kingdom of Gwynedd in North Wales. She was the daughter of King Cynan Dindaethwy ap Rhodri of Gwynedd.

== Marriage and dynastic descents ==
Esyllt ferch Cynan was an eighth century princess of the Kingdom of Gwynedd in North Wales. At some point, she was married to Gwriad ap Elidyr, also known as Gwriad Manaw. It is possible this was a later invention to legitimise the claims to Gwynedd by the descendants of Merfyn Frych King of Gwynedd from c. 825 to 844.

According to some source Merfyn was Esyllt's son, in others he was her husband, which then made Esyllt the mother of Rhodri Mawr (Rhodri the Great) although Nest ferch Cadell, daughter of Cadell ap Brochfael of the Kingdom of Powys is considered a more likely candidate for this role.

Whichever the case, Esyllt was a key matriarchal figure for the royal houses of Gwynedd and Deheubarth in Wales in the Early Middle Ages, giving a matrilineal link of descent to the line of King Cunedda.

After the death of Esyllt's father Cynan in 816, the throne was secured by her uncle Hywel ap Rhodri Molwynog. On Hywel's death, the throne was claimed by Merfyn Frych with his descent via Esyllt playing a part in his claim to the throne.

Records of Esyllt descent and descendants are found in the late fourteenth century Genealogies from Jesus College MS 20 compiled from earlier but unidentified Welsh sources.

== Sources ==
- Powell, David (1584). The historie of Cambria, now called Wales: a part of the most famous Yland of Brytaine, written in the Brytish language aboue two hundreth yeares past. Translated by Llwyd, Humphrey. London: Rafe Newberrie and Henrie Denham. IA historieofcambri00cara.
