= Bwrdd Arthur =

Protected area in Anglesey, Wales

Coordinates: 53.31089°N 4.1232°W

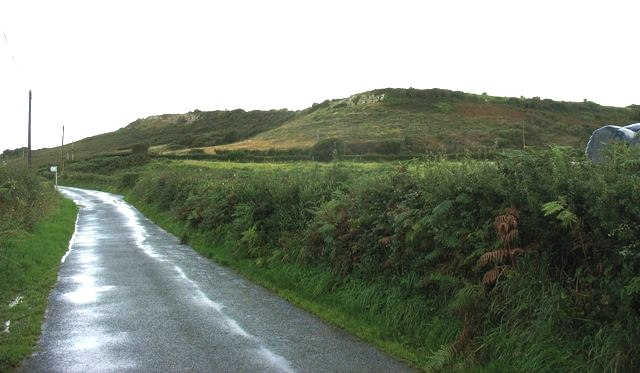
Limestone outcrop at Bwrdd Arthur

Bwrdd Arthur (Welsh for 'Arthur's Table'), also known as Din Sylwy, is a 164-metre (538 ft) flat-topped limestone hill on the island of Anglesey, in Wales. Located on the eastern end of Red Wharf Bay, some 3 kilometres north west of Llangoed, it is noteworthy from the evidence of pre-historic occupation and as a Site of Special Scientific Interest designated for its botanical interest.

The tiny medieval church of St Michael is on the eastern side of the hill fort.

== Botany ==
The site has both calcareous heath and limestone exposures which between them support plant communities including western gorse Ulex gallii, common rockrose Helianthemum nummularium, pale St. John's wort Hypericum montanum, Frog orchid Coeloglossum viride, ivy broomrape Orobanche hederae and the nationally rare hoary rockrose Helianthemum canum.

== Archaeology ==
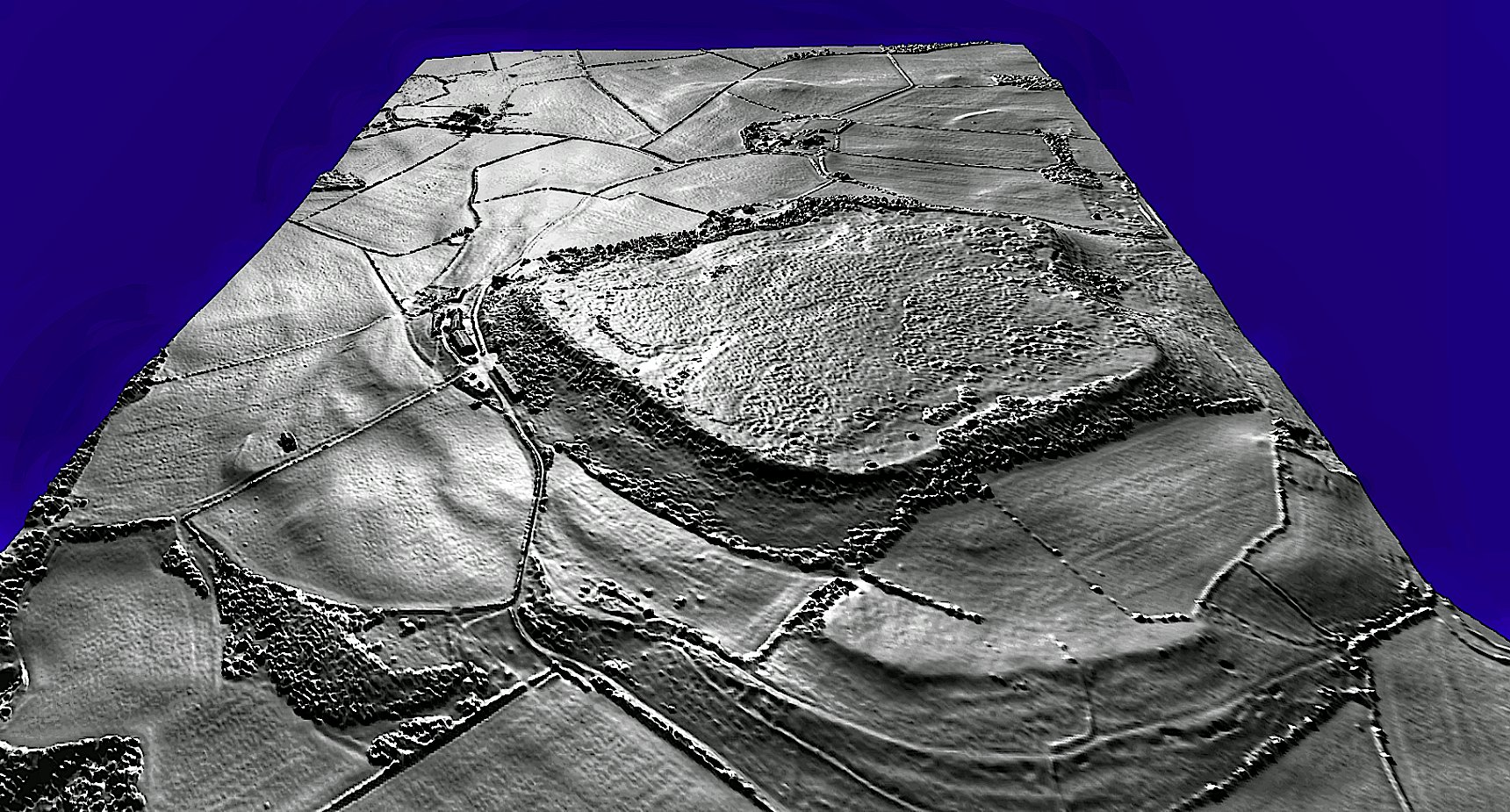
A lidar view of Bwrdd Arthur.

The whole site, which is in private ownership, is a scheduled monument and is believed to have been occupied as a significant hill fort both before and during the Roman invasion.
