= Elisedd ap Cyngen =

Welsh royal

Elisedd ap Cyngen ap Cadell was a son of Cyngen ap Cadell the last King of Powys.

== Biography ==
He was a son of Cyngen ap Cadell the last King of Powys of the Gwertherion (Vortigern) Dynasty who claimed descent through Brochwel Ysgithrog. Cyngen died in Rome in 855 having fled the aggression of Gwynedd. His sister Nest ferch Cadell then married Merfyn (Frych) Ap Gwriadone (or possibly Mefyn's father Gwriad ab Elidir, depending on which genealogy one gives authority to) and they became the parents of Rhodri Mawr, ruler of Gwynedd, who then unified Wales under his rule. Lewys Dwnn in his visitation to Wales reports "Cadell ap Brochwell had but one daughter named Nest, who carried off the Province from the males, as appeareth, etc" (vol. i, p319).

In order to explain the persistence of a male line claiming descent from the princes of Powys when the princely line ends with Cyngen, some authorities claim that he had no sons, and present the genealogy that Elisedd ap Cyngen, Aeddan ap Cyngen and Gryffydd ap Cyngen were not children of this Cyngen, but of Cyngen ap Brochfael ap Elisedd ap Gwylog, great uncle to this Cyngen. This account justifies a male line descended from the princes of Powys while also simplifying the inheritance of the principality through Nest ferch Cadell to the Gwynedd line.

It is reported in the Annales Cambriae (The Annals of Wales) that in 814 "Gruffydd son of Cyngen is killed by treachery by his brother Elisedd after an interval of two months". It may be that Gruffydd was the eldest son, and through this murder Elisedd claimed his lands and titles - but this is only conjecture.

When the herald Lewys Dwnn visited Wales between 1586 and 1613 to gather pedigrees that would clarify the inherited status and titles of the leading families of Powys, many of them claimed princely blood by descent from children of Cyngen. His inscription on the Pillar of Eliseg then justified a pedigree further back for any claims they made. The pedigrees recorded by Lewys Dwnn are mainly consistent and evidently were agreed by different families, so where there are errors, local tradition, and local consensus supported them. However, there are clearly too few generations between the 9th and 15th centuries for them to be accurate.

One title often used to describe this line is that of "Lord of Guilsfield, Broniarth and Deytheur" which was a title first used by Cyngen according to the Welsh Chronicle. This line may have inherited control of those lands from Cyngen and passed them down as the last local inheritance of the princes of Powys until they were lost after the failure of the rebellion of Owain Glyndŵr. The manorial title of Broniarth is currently held by Baron Harlech while that of Guilsfield is held by the Earl of Powis.

== See also ==
- Kings of Wales family trees
