= Llanfaes =

Village in Anglesey, Wales

Coordinates: 53.27928°N 4.09565°W

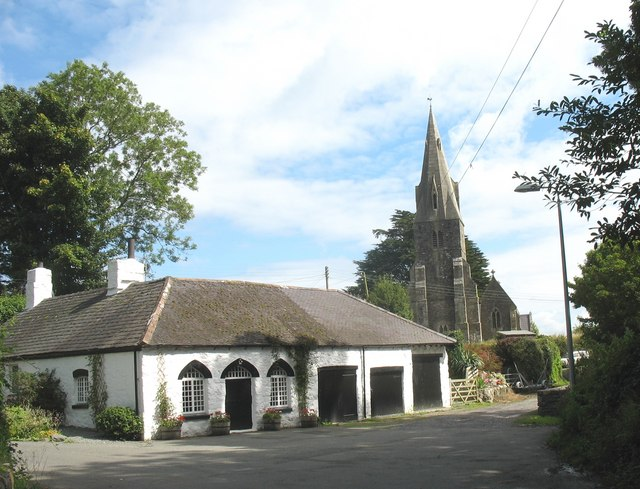

- Location within Anglesey
- OS grid reference: SH603778
- Principal area: Anglesey
- Preserved county: Gwynedd
- Country: Wales
- Sovereign state: United Kingdom
- Post town: BEAUMARIS
- Postcode district: LL58
- Dialling code: +01248
- Police: North Wales
- Fire: North Wales
- Ambulance: Welsh
- UK Parliament: Ynys Môn
- Senedd Cymru – Welsh Parliament: Bangor Conwy Môn

Llanfaes (Welsh pronunciation: [ɬanˈvaːɨ̯s]; formerly also known as Llanmaes) is a small village on the island of Anglesey, Wales, located on the shore of the eastern entrance to the Menai Strait, the tidal waterway separating Anglesey from the north Wales coast. Its natural harbour made it an important medieval port and it was briefly the capital of the kingdom of Gwynedd. Following Prince Madoc's Rebellion, Edward I removed the Welsh population from the town and rebuilt the port a mile to the south at Beaumaris. It is in the community of Beaumaris.

== Name ==
The current settlement of Llanfaes was originally known as Llan Ffagan Fach ("Church" or "Monastery of Fagan the Little") in honour of a Ffagan who founded a church at the site. Saint Fagan was supposed to have been a 2nd-century apostle among the Welsh and is also commemorated at St. Fagan's in Cardiff. The present name doesn't refer to a saint, but instead is simply Welsh for the "Church" or "Monastery in the Meadow".

Although both towns are pronounced Llanfaes in Welsh, the British government distinguishes an identically named settlement in Glamorgan by spelling it Llanmaes. However, the town on Anglesey has also historically been known by that spelling as well. An unofficial Welsh variant is Llan-faes with a hyphen.

== History ==
In the medieval kingdom of Gwynedd, Llanfaes functioned as the royal demesne (Welsh: maerdref) and seat of local governance for the commote of Dindaethwy in cantref Rhosyr King Cynan Dindaethwy maintained his royal court (Welsh: llys) in the town around the turn of the 9th century, but he was killed amid a protracted struggle against a rival named Hywel. Following Cynan's death, there was a major Battle of Llanmaes (Welsh: Gwaith Llanfaes) recorded in all the Welsh annals. Various sources conjecture that the battle marked an invasion by Mercians, Wessaxons, or Vikings, but the original sources simply do not record the combatants.

A wooden fortress – square with a round tower at each corner – was constructed at the site by the Normans Hugh the Wolf of Chester and Hugh the Red of Shrewsbury during their 1098 invasion. During the Battle of Anglesey Sound between the Two Hughs and King Magnus Barefoot of Norway, Magnus was said to have personally shot Hugh the Red through the eye with an arrow before discovering whom he was fighting and withdrawing back to the north.

Llanmaes was still (or again) a maerdref during the 12th and 13th centuries, when its royal estates encompassed 780 acres. A stream powered a mill there and it was the northernmost ferry across the Menai Strait separating Anglesey from the mainland. The town also had a leper colony to its north. By the end of the 13th century, it had become such an important trading centre that some estimates credit its trade in ale, wine, wool, and hides with 70% of Gwynedd's tariff revenue. It also held two annual fairs and maintained a herring fishery. When Llywelyn the Great's wife Joan, the daughter of King John of England, died in 1237, her body was buried at Llanmaes and a Franciscan monastery constructed at Llywelyn's expense at the site.

The Llanmaes suffered during the rebellion of Madog ap Llywelyn (1294–95), at the end of which Edward I visited Llanfaes and ordered the construction of the new castle and town of Beaumaris nearby as part of his pacification campaign. The nearby site of Porth y Wygyr ("Vikingport") or Cerrig y Gwyddyl ("Irishstone") was chosen and Edward evicted Llanmaes's Welsh population to the opposite coast of the island, turning Rhosyr into "Newborough". Beaumaris then appropriated Llanmaes's former ferry and coastal trade.

The monastery at Llanfaes was restored with help from Edward II (r. 1307–27) but then thoroughly plundered and destroyed by agents of Henry IV as a punishment for its friars' support of the Glyndŵr Rising (1400–1415). Whatever was subsequently rebuilt was dissolved with the other monasteries by Henry VIII in 1537. Afterwards, the church was used a barn and Joan's stone coffin as a watering trough before being removed along with the monastery's other furnishings to St. Mary's and St. Nicholas's in Beaumaris.

The fortress first established by the Normans was held during the English Civil War by Sir Thomas Cheadle on behalf of the Parliament but was taken from him by Col. John Robinson in 1645 or 1646.

== Notable people ==
Plaid Cymru politician Carmen Smith grew up on a council estate in Llanfaes, and took the designation Baroness Smith of Llanfaes, of Llanfaes in the County of Ynys Môn when introduced as a life peer in the House of Lords in 2024.

== See also ==
- Llanfaes Friary
- Carmen Smith, Baroness Smith of Llanfaes
- Beaumaris, the nearby town which replaced Llanmaes
