= John Edward Lloyd =

Welsh historian (1861–1947)

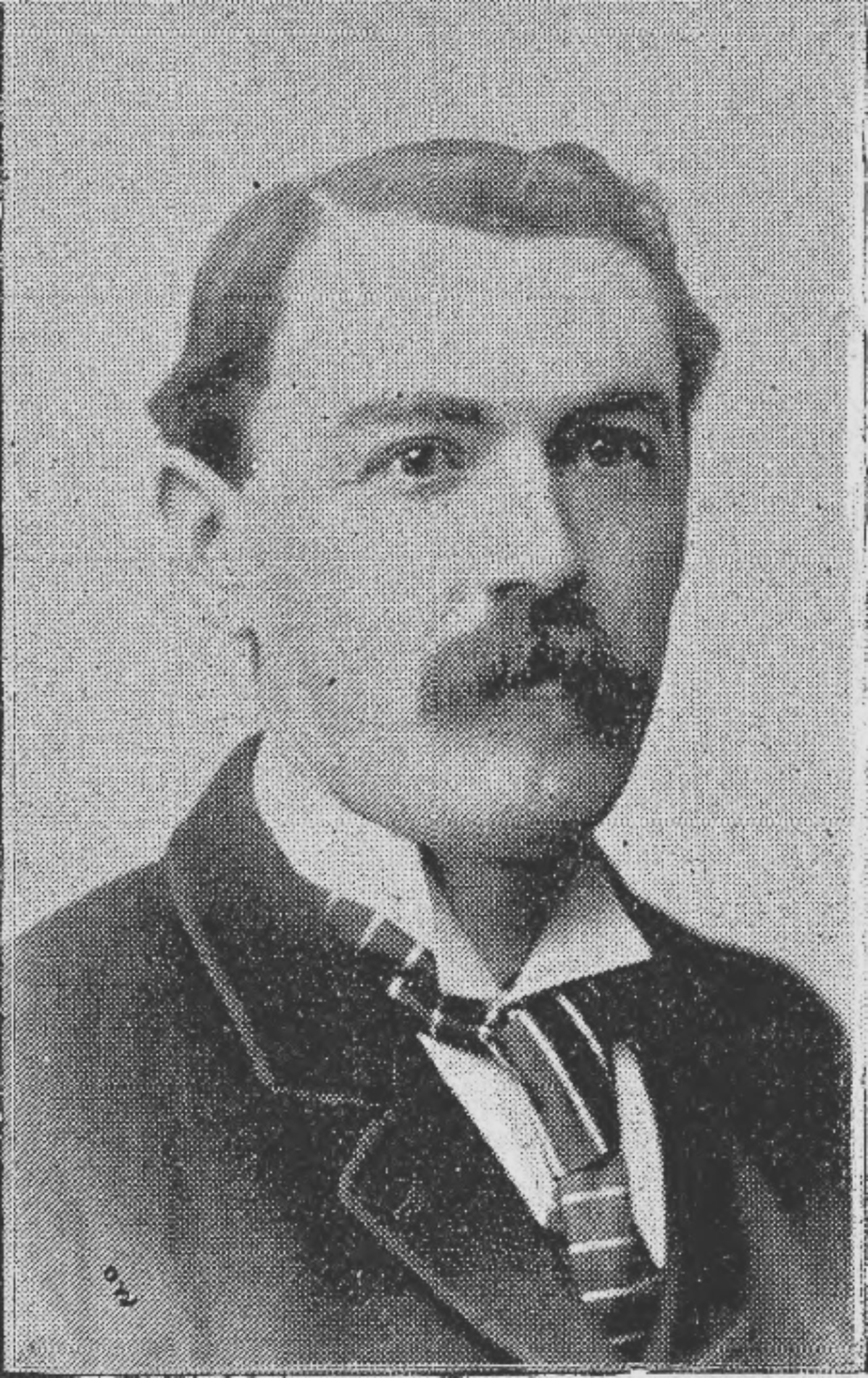
Sir John Edward Lloyd (1894)

Sir John Edward Lloyd (5 May 1861 – 20 June 1947) was a Welsh historian who is credited with being the founding father of Welsh medieval studies and of creating the foundations of modern Welsh history. He was born in Liverpool, England, on 5 May 1861, to Edward Lloyd (1837–1917) and Margaret Lloyd (née Jones) (1834–1921). In 1883 he graduated from Lincoln College, Oxford with a first class honours degree in Classical Moderations. In 1885 he obtained an academic post in the University College of Wales, Aberystwyth, Mid Wales, a college of the University of Wales. In 1892 he obtained a post in Bangor University in North Wales as a lecturer in Welsh history. In 1893 he married Clementina Miller of Aberdeen, who was a former pupil of his at Aberystwyth. They had two children, Eluned in 1897, and Edward in 1904. He was knighted in 1934.

== Early life and education ==
Lloyd was born in Liverpool on 5 May 1861 to two Welsh-speaking middle class parents, Edward Lloyd (1837–1917), a prosperous draper and a J.P., and Margaret Lloyd (née Jones) (1834–1921), and was brought up to speak Welsh. (Note: Lloyd later had a sister, Margaret Alice, who was born in 1864, and a brother, Thomas Arthur, who was born in 1866. (Pryce 2011, p. 15).) The success of his father's business enabled Lloyd to be admitted to a small private school, 'Chatham Institute', in Liverpool. (Note: 'Chatham Institute' described itself in an advertisement as a ‘select private school for boys’. (Dr. Henry Baker Bates Sutton, St. Helens).) Having succeeded in his 'Oxford Local Examinations', in 1877 Lloyd enrolled in the University College of Wales, Aberystwyth, the first constituent college in the federal University of Wales. Two years later, he passed the matriculation examination for London University and qualified for a prize. However, 'his sights were set on Oxford' and in 1881 he enrolled in Lincoln College, Oxford. In 1883 he graduated from the college with a first class honours degree in Classical Moderations, having obtained the best degree of his year. Lloyd returned to his alma mater in 1885 to take up his first academic post, teaching English history. In 1891 he applied for the post of its College Principal, following the resignation of Thomas Charles Edwards. However, the university instead appointed Thomas Francis Roberts, the Professor of Greek at the University College of South Wales and Monmouthshire in Cardiff, South Wales. Feeling slighted, he looked for an academic post elsewhere, which he obtained in the following year in Bangor University.

== Bangor University ==
Lloyd accepted the offer of a post in Bangor University in March 1892 and began work there as secretary and registrar in the following month, when he was appointed as Permanent Lecturer in Welsh History. He married Clementina (Tina) Miller, a former student from Aberdeen, Scotland, who had attended his history classes in Aberystwyth in February 1893. (Note: Lloyd and his wife had two children, Eluned, who was born in 1897, and Edward, who was born in 1904. (Pryce 2011, p. 66).)

Lloyd became a much-published and famous Welsh historian. In 1892, while he was at Bangor, Daniel Lleufer Thomas asked him to 'take on some of the Welsh entries for the Dictionary of National Biography (DNB)' (Note: Rees (1957) expressed his surprise that 'John Edward Lloyd was the only representative of the staff of the Welsh Colleges to be invited (and that indirectly) to become a regular contributor on eminent Welshmen to the Dictionary of National Biography.' (Rees 1957).), with which he 'readily complied, and between 1893 and 1900 published over one hundred entries'. Beginning in 1893 he had published 'three short bilingual textbooks for elementary (primary) schoolchildren, outlining the history of Wales from the Stone Age to the death of Llywelyn ap Gruffudd in 1282.' (Note: An English translation of the textbooks was published as one book in 1906.) In 1905 he published, as an allotment-holder, The Great Forest of Brecknock History of the Forest from The Conquest of England to The Present Time, in the Preface of which he disclosed: 'Nearly all the documents referred to are to be found among the "Maybery Papers," and are authentic and trustworthy, many of them being the original documents.' (Note: The Maybery Papers are named after their initial custodian, Arthur Maybery, solicitor of Brecon and are held in the National Library of Wales. The Library holds letters from Lloyd to Mrs. L.P. Maybery about his custody of them and his plans for cataloguing them.) In the following year Lloyd made a substantial contribution to the history of iron production in South Wales with his illustrated book The early history of the old South Wales iron works (1760 to 1840), which is based upon the Maybery Papers and which starts with the history of the Brecon Ironworks.

In 1911 and 1912 Lloyd had published the first serious history of the country's formative years with his two-volume A History of Wales from the Earliest Times to the Edwardian Conquest. In 1919 he was admitted as a Fellow to the Society of Antiquaries of London. In 1932 he had published his Owain Glyn Dŵr (Owen Glendower). Also he became the first editor of 'Y Bywgraffiadur Cymreig' (Dictionary of Welsh Biography), which was published posthumously in 1953. Its English counterpart, the Dictionary of Welsh Biography, was launched in 1959 with Robert Thomas Jenkins as its sole editor.

== Publications ==
The following publications are a selection of Lloyd's published output. See Jones (1948) under 'Further reading' and Works by or about John Edward Lloyd at the Internet Archive for additional publications.

=== Articles ===
- Lloyd, John Edward (1892). "Welsh place-names: A study of some common name-elements". Y Cymmrodor. II: 15–60.
- Lloyd, J.E. 1899–1900. Wales and the coming of the Normans (1039–1093). Transactions of the Honourable Society of Cymmrodorion. 138-44.
- Lloyd, John Edward (1919). "Who was Gwenllian de Lacy?". Archaeologia Cambrensis Journal of the Cambrian Archaeological Association. XIX (Part III July): 292-298.
- —— (1928). "Hywel Dda: the historical setting". Aberystwyth Studies. 10: 1–4.
- —— (1928). "The Welsh chronicles [Sir John Rhŷs Memorial Lecture]". Proceedings of the British Academy. 14: 369–391. (Note: See Welsh chronicles, Bangor University Welsh Chronicles and Joyce 2021.)
- —— (1944). "The death of Arthur". Bulletin of the Board of Celtic Studies. XI: 158-160.

=== Books ===
- Lloyd, John Edward (1896). Ail Lyfr Hanes (Hanes Cymru o 400 Hyd 1066 O.C.). Caernarfon: Cwmni'r Wasg Genedlaethol Gymreig.
- Lloyd, John (1903). Historical Memoranda of Breconshire; a Collection of Papers from Various Sources Relating to the History of the County, Volume 1. Brecon: Ellis Owen, 'Brecon & Radnor Express Offices'.
- Lloyd, John (1904). Historical Memoranda of Breconshire; a Collection of Papers from Various Sources Relating to the History of the County, Volume II. Bangor: John Lloyd.
- Lloyd, J.E. (1914). Carnarvonshire. Cambridge: University Press.
- Lloyd, John Edward (1929). The Welsh Chronicles (From the Proceedings of the British Academy). London: Humphrey Milford.
- —— (1932). Wales and the Past Two voices. Cardiff: National Museum of Wales.

=== Editorships ===
- (With Hubert Lewis) Lloyd, J.E. (1889). The ancient laws of Wales. London: Elliot Stock.
- Lloyd, John Edward (1928). Hywel Dda: Penn a Molyant yr Holl Vrytanyeit (Brut y Tywysogion) 928–1928. Caerdydd: Gwasg Prifysgol Cymru.
- —— (1935). A History of Carmarthenshire. Vol. I. Cardiff: London Carmarthenshire Society.
- —— (1939). A History of Carmarthenshire. Vol. II. Cardiff: London Carmarthenshire Society.
- (With R.T. Jenkins) —— (1959). The Dictionary of Welsh Biography down to 1940. London: Honourable Society of Cymmrodorion.
