= Genealogies from Jesus College MS 20 =

Medieval Welsh genealogies

- Author(s): anonymous
- Language: Middle Welsh
- Manuscript(s): Oxford, Bodleian Library, Jesus College, MS. 20, folios 33r–41r
- Genre: genealogical collection

The genealogies from Jesus College MS 20 are a medieval Welsh collection of genealogies preserved in a single manuscript, Oxford University, Bodleian Library, Jesus College, MS 20, folios 33r–41r. It presents the lineages of a number of medieval Welsh rulers, particularly those of south Wales. The manuscript was compiled in the late 14th century, but many genealogies are thought to be considerably older. The latest pedigrees to have been included in the tract are those of Llywelyn ab Iorwerth (d. 1240) and Rhys Gryg (d. 1234). It shares some material with the earlier Harleian genealogies.

== See also ==
- Harleian Genealogies
- Bonedd Gwŷr y Gogledd
- Book of Baglan
