= Maelgwn Gwynedd =

King of Gwynedd from c. 571 to c. 598

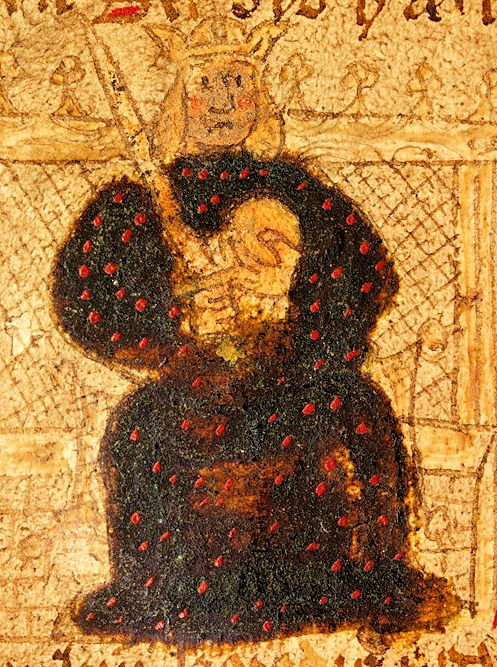
History of the Kings, Maelgwn Gwynedd

Maelgwn Gwynedd (Latin: Maglocunus; died c. 598) was King of Gwynedd during the early 6th century. Surviving records suggest he held a pre-eminent position among the Brythonic kings in Wales and their allies in the "Old North" along the Scottish coast. Maelgwn was a generous supporter of Christianity, funding the foundation of churches throughout Wales and even far beyond the bounds of his own kingdom. Nonetheless, his principal legacy today is the scathing account of his behavior recorded in De Excidio et Conquestu Britanniae by Gildas, who considered Maelgwn a usurper and reprobate. He was the son of Cadwallon Lawhir ap Einion and great-grandson of Cunedda. According to legend, Maelgwn died of the "yellow plague", debated among historians as either the delayed arrival of Plague of Justinian or an extreme variant of Relapsing fever which causes jaundice, and was buried on Ynys Seiriol (now known as Puffin Island in English), off the eastern tip of Anglesey.

== Name ==
Maelgwn (IPA: /mɑːɨlgʊn/) is a Middle Welsh name meaning "Princely Hound". Attested in Latin as Maglocunus in Gildas' De Excidio et Conquestu Britanniae, it derives from a Common Brittonic form reconstructed as *Maglo-kunos, a compound composed of the root *maglo- (MW. mael) meaning "prince", attached to *cun- (cwn), an old oblique case root of *cū (ci), meaning "hound, dog". As the word for "hound" was sometimes used as a kenning for warriors in early Welsh poetry, the name may also be translated as 'Princely Warrior'.

== Reign ==
After the collapse of Roman authority in Britain, north Wales was invaded and colonized by Gaelic tribes from Ireland. The kingdom of Gwynedd began with the reconquest of the coast by northern Britons under the command of Maelgwn's great-grandfather Cunedda. Three generations later, Maelgwn's father Cadwallon Lawhir ap Einion completed the process by destroying the last Irish settlements on Anglesey. Maelgwn was the first king to enjoy the fruits of his family's conquest and he is considered the founder of the medieval kingdom's royal family. He is thus most commonly referenced by appending the name of the kingdom to his own: Maelgwn Gwynedd.

By tradition, his llys (English: royal court, literally hall) was located at Deganwy, in the Creuddyn Peninsula of Rhos or Llanrhos. The Annals Cambriae holds that he died in 547 and entered 'The long sleep of Maelgwn in the court of Rhos'. Other traditions say that he was buried at Ynys Seiriol (English: Island of St. Seiriol, Puffin Island), off easternmost Anglesey. There are no historical records to confirm or deny these traditions.

Historical records of this early era are scant. Maelgwn appears in the royal genealogies of the Harleian genealogies, Jesus College MS. 20, and Hengwrt MS. 202. His death in a "great mortality" of 598 is noted in the Historia Brittonum. Tradition holds that he died of the "Yellow Plague" (dylyt melen) of Rhos, but this is based on one of the Triads that was written much later. The record says only that it was a "great mortality", which followed the outbreak of the great Plague of Justinian in Constantinople by a few years.

Maelgwn was a generous contributor to the cause of Christianity throughout Wales. He made donations to support saints Brynach in Dyfed, Cadoc in Gwynllwg, Cybi in Anglesey, Padarn in Ceredigion, and Tydecho in Powys. He is also associated with the foundation of Bangor, but hard evidence of this is lacking. In his 1723 Mona Antiqua Restaurata, Henry Rowlands asserts that Bangor was raised to an episcopal see by Maelgwn in 550, but he provides no source for the assertion.

The only contemporary information about the person is provided by Gildas, who includes Maelgwn among the five British kings whom he condemns in allegorical terms in his De Excidio et Conquestu Britanniae. He says Maelgwn held a regional pre-eminence among the other four kings, going on to say that he overthrew his maternal uncle (Latin: avunculus) to gain the throne; that he had taken up life as a monk but then returned to the secular world; that he had been married and divorced, then remarried to the widow of his nephew after being responsible for his nephew's death; and that he was tall. Some historians identify Owain Danwyn as the overthrown uncle. Gildas was fluent in Latin and would be more likely to have used a different word (Latin: patruus) if describing Maelgwn's father's brother Owain.

== "High king" ==
The evidence suggests that Maelgwn held a pre-eminent position over the regions ruled by the descendants of Cunedda, perhaps in the sense of a regional high king. There is nothing to suggest that Maelgwn held sway over any larger area. Gildas says as much in his condemnation, saying he held a pre-eminence over the other four kings similarly condemned, and also describing him as the "dragon of the island", where the Isle of Anglesey is the ancient stronghold of the kings of Gwynedd.

The fact that Maelgwn's donations to religious foundations are not restricted to the Kingdom of Gwynedd but are spread throughout northern and southern Wales in the regions where the descendants of Cunedda held sway implies that Maelgwn had a responsibility to those regions beyond the responsibilities of a king to his own kingdom.

While the context is not definitive, Taliesin also implies it, in his Marwnad Rhun (English: Elegy of Rhun) that laments the death of Maelgwn's son Rhun, where he says that Rhun's death is "the fall of the court and girdle of Cunedda".

== Gildas ==
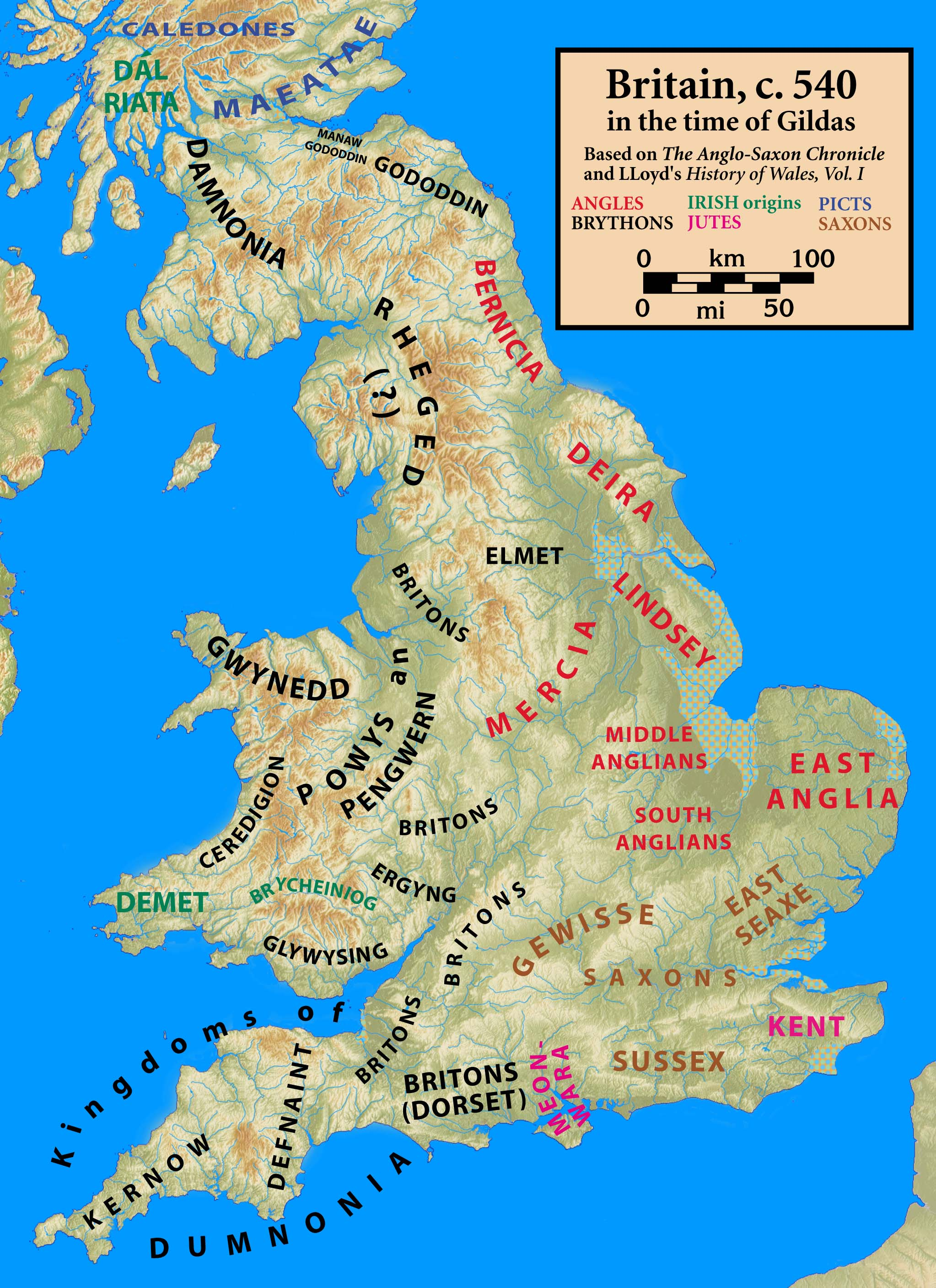

In his work On the Ruin and Conquest of Britain written c. 540, Gildas makes an allegorical condemnation of five British kings by likening them to the beasts of the Book of Revelation 13:2 — the lion, leopard, bear and dragon, with the dragon supreme among them. He says that Maelgwn is the "dragon of the island", and goes on with a litany of moral accusations, in the process describing him almost as a regional high king over the other kings (the power-giving dragon of the Apocalypse). The Isle of Anglesey was the base of power of the kings of Gwynedd, so describing Maelgwn as the "dragon of the island" is appropriate.

Gildas restricts his attention to the kings of Gwynedd (Maelgwn), Dyfed (Vortiporius), Penllyn (probable, as its king Cuneglasus (Cynlas) appears in royal genealogies associated with the region), Damnonia/Alt Clud or Dumnonia (Constantine), and the unknown region associated with Caninus. Gwynedd is associated with the conquest of the Gaels by Cunedda, while Alt Clud had a long and ongoing relationship with Gwynedd and its kings.

In the course of his condemnations, Gildas makes passing reference to the other beasts mentioned in the Apocalypse, such as the eagle, serpent, calf and wolf. The reason for Gildas' disaffection for these individuals is unknown. He was selective in his choice of kings, as he had no comments concerning the kings of the other British kingdoms that were thriving at the time, such as Rheged, Gododdin, Elmet, Pengwern/Powys, or the kingdoms of modern-day southern England. That he chose only the kings associated with one king's pre-eminence (Maelgwn, the "dragon") suggests a reason other than his claim of moral outrage over personal depravity. Neither outrage nor a doctrinal dispute would seem to justify beginning the condemnation of the five kings with a personal attack against the mother of one of the kings, calling her an "unclean lioness".

== Literary record ==
In the Historia Brittonum, Nennius says that "the great king Mailcun reigned among the Britons, i.e., in Gwynedd". He adds that Maelgwn's ancestor Cunedda arrived in Gwynedd 146 years before Maelgwn's reign, coming from Manaw Gododdin, and expelled the Scots [i.e., the Gaels] with great slaughter.

Maelgwn appears once in the Welsh Triads: In the "Three Tribal Thrones of the Island of Britain", which describes three seats of power, each ruled by Arthur, Maelgwn is Arthur's Chief of Elders in Mynyw (St Davids). The pestilence that killed him also appears as one of the "Three Dreadful Pestilences of the Isle of Britain". It is described as the Yellow Plague of Rhos, originating from the carcasses of the dead.

There is an incidental mention of Maelgwn in the song To Maenwyn found in the Red Book of Hergest and attributed to Llywarch Hen. The steward (Welsh: maer) Maenwyn is encouraged to resist a command to surrender his post and show his fidelity to Maelgwn.

In the Book of Llandaff, compiled c. 1125, Maelgwn Gwynedd is claimed to be one of the benefactors of the Diocese of Llandaff in its early years. One of the specific places mentioned is at Louhai (Tintern parva, some six miles north of Chepstow), where Maelgwn is claimed as a secular witness to its donation.

In the Black Book of Carmarthen, Dormarch, Gwyn ap Nudd's favourite hound, is recorded as previously belonging to Maelgwn Gwynedd. This is significant in relation to the mythological role of his new master in the Wild Hunt.

== Fictional tradition ==
As a famous king of the past, Maelgwn's name figures strongly in Welsh legend. It is used more often than most in questionable accounts of history and in genuine efforts at history that either invent fictions of their own or repeat the fictions of others as though they were true. Some of the most significant sources of misinformation about Maelgwn are:

=== The History of the Kings of Britain ===
Geoffrey of Monmouth's 12th century pseudohistorical Historia Regum Britanniae includes Maelgwn (Malgo) as a character in its account of British history. It says that Saint David was buried at St Davids on the command of "Malgo, king of the Venedotians", that Malgo addicted himself to sodomy, and that he was succeeded by a certain Careticus. It adds that Britain had groaned under the barbarians since the time of Malgo, that Malgo was the fourth king of Britain after Arthur, and that Malgo had two sons, Ennianus and Runo.

Scholars contend that there is no authority for any of this except Geoffrey's fertile imagination. Historically, Rhun ap Maelgwn was Maelgwn's son and successor (though this may be the "Runo" Geoffrey refers to). Geoffrey appears to twist Gildas' words to obtain his reference to sodomy. In his condemnation of 5 British kings in the De Excidio et Conquestu Britanniae, Gildas refers to wine as "sodomitical" but never applies that word to any person.

=== The Brut Tysilio ===
Once attributed to Saint Tysilio (died 640), the Chronicle of the Kings of Britain was written c. 1500 as an amalgam of earlier versions of the Brut y Brenhinedd, a derivative of Geoffrey of Monmouth's Historia Regum Britanniae. Among its spurious claims is that Maelgwn Gwynedd came to the crown following Vortiper, that he was succeeded by a certain Caretig, that he was the fourth king of all Britain after Arthur, and that he had two sons, Einion and Rhun.

=== The Iolo Manuscripts ===
Maelgwn Gwynedd is mentioned repeatedly in the spurious 18th century Iolo Manuscripts of Iolo Morganwg. His three Chief Bards are named, and he is proclaimed King Paramount over the other kings. A Maelgwn Hir of Llandaff is described, and said to be commonly mistaken for Maelgwn Gwynedd. Taliesin is said to have been dispossessed of his property by Maelgwn, and so cursed him. Saint Eurgain is said to be Maelgwn's daughter. Saint Cwyllog, daughter of Caw Cawlwyd of Twr Celyn, had been given lands by Maelgwn Gwynedd. In "The Three Holy Families of the Isle of Britain", there is a story of Caw and his children who had been driven from their lands by the Gwyddelian Picts, and who then came to Wales and were given land in Anglesey by Maelgwn. Without independent and reputable verification, the material found in the Iolo Manuscripts is considered to be the product of Iolo's fertile imagination.

=== The Tale of Taliesin ===
The Tale of Taliesin (Hanes Taliesin or Ystoria Taliesin) is a genuine legendary story about Taliesin which is preserved in two principal redactions dating from the mid-16th century and the early 17th century but which probably derives from older sources. It was first printed in Lady Charlotte Guest's translation of the Mabinogion: the notes to that edition are the work of Iolo Morganwg and contain inaccuracies and some of his inventions. The story itself tells of events where the Taliesin of legend is placed in difficult or impossible situations but invariably overcomes all obstacles, usually through feats of magic. Maelgwn Gwynedd is conspicuously depicted in a negative light, being foiled in unscrupulous actions of deceit and being outwitted.

The historical Taliesin was actually a contemporary of Maelgwn Gwynedd's son and successor Rhun. An elegy for Rhun, the Marwnad Rhun (English: Elegy of Rhun) was once attributed to Taliesin by some scholars. but is now considered to be of later provenance and is no longer accepted as his work. There is nothing to connect the historical Taliesin with Maelgwn Gwynedd, although references to the legend are found in medieval Welsh poems.

=== The Chronicle of the Scottish Nation ===
According to the account of John of Fordun's Chronicle of the Scottish Nation, written c. 1360, a certain "Maglo, King of the Britons" asks for aid from King Aydanus. There is nothing to link Maelgwn Gwynedd to the Pictish king, Fordun's claim notwithstanding. In the next section, Fordun says that later on it is "Cadwallo, King of the Britons" who is receiving aid from King Aydanus.

This story is repeated uncritically in some later histories, and subsequently "Malgo the Briton" is mentioned in Thomas Stephens' notes on an 1888 publication of Y Gododdin, with the stated suggestion that Maelgwn was an ally of "Aeddan" against the Pictish king Bridei. Fordun's Chronicle is given as one of Stephens' references.

=== The Pictish king Bridei ===
Bridei (died c. 584) was the son of a certain Maelchon (or Melcho, or Maelchú in Irish records). Aside from having a similar name, there is nothing that connects the father of Bridei to Maelgwn Gwynedd.

Of those who have promoted a connection, perhaps the most notable person of late is John Morris in his Age of Arthur, where he refers in passing and without authority, to "... Bridei, son of Maelgwn, the mighty king of north Wales, ...". Though the book has been a commercial success, it is disparaged by historians as an unreliable source of "misleading and misguided" information.

=== Later fiction ===
As a famous king of the past, Maelgwn has been associated with unsubstantiated but popular legends and stories throughout history. Modern authors have occasionally used his name as a character in fictional stories. These include the trilogies of Traci Harding, Mary Gilgannon's historical novels, and a fantasy novel by Nikolai Tolstoy.

== Family and children ==
His father was Cadwallon Lawhir and his mother Meddyf, a daughter of Maeldaf. He had a brother and nephew, mentioned in Gildas' De Excidio, but they are unnamed. He is given various wives, including Nesta, Sanan (his nephew's wife) and Gwallwyn (possibly his cousin). It is also possible that he impregnated the Pictish princess Waelgush.

His children are variously given as:

- Alser;
- Doeg;
- Einion;
- Eurgain (daughter);
- Rhun Hir.

It is possible but highly debated whether Bridei I and his sister Domelch were children of Maelgwn. Their father is given as Máelchú, which is the Irish form of Maelgwn.

It is likely that Maelgwn is the earliest well attested figure (contemporaneously by Gildas) in Europe whose descendants are recorded up to the present; through the House of Gwynedd, and later House of Tudor.

== See also ==
- Family tree of Welsh monarchs

== Sources ==
- Davies, John (1993), A History of Wales (First ed.), London: Penguin Group, ISBN 0-7139-9098-8
- Evans, John Gwenogvryn (1906), The Black Book of Carmarthen (First ed.), Pwllheli
- Giles, John Allen, ed. (1841), The Works of Gildas and Nennius, London: James Bohn – English translation.
- Giles, John Allen, ed. (1854), History of the Ancient Britons, vol. II (Second ed.), Oxford: W. Baxter – in Latin.
- Giles, John Allen, ed. (1900), "Geoffrey of Monmouth's British History", Six Old English Chronicles, London: George Bell and Sons, pp. 89–294
- Charlotte, ed. (1877), The Mabinogion, London: Bernard Quaritch
- Jenkins, Samuel (1852), Letters on Welsh History, Philadelphia: E. S. Jones & Co.
- Lloyd, John Edward (1912), A History of Wales from the Earliest Times to the Edwardian Conquest, vol. I (2nd ed.), London: Longmans, Green, and Co.
- Morris-Jones, John (1918), "Taliesin", in Evans, E. Vincent (ed.), Y Cymmrodor, vol. XXVIII, London: Honourable Society of Cymmrodorion
- Owen, Aneurin, ed. (1841), Ancient Laws and Institutes of Wales, vol. I, Commissioners of the Public Records of the Kingdom
- Parry, John Humffreys (1821), "Genealogy of the Saints", The Cambro-Briton, vol. III, London: W. Simpkin and R. Marshall, pp. 7–11, 81–87, 137–140, 201–204, 266–269, 335–338, 394–396, 455–458
- Phillimore, Egerton G. B. (1886), "Boned y Seint (A Fragment from Hengwrt MS. No. 202)", in Powel, Thomas (ed.), Y Cymmrodor, vol. VII, Honourable Society of Cymmrodorion, pp. 133–134
- Phillimore, Egerton, ed. (1887), "Pedigrees from Jesus College MS. 20", Y Cymmrodor, vol. VIII, Honourable Society of Cymmrodorion, pp. 77–92
- Rees, Rice (1836), An Essay on the Welsh Saints, London: Longman, Rees, Orme, Brown, Green, and Longman, Rees
- Rees, William Jenkins (1840), The Liber Landavensis, Llyfr Teilo, Llandovery: William Rees – from MSS. in the Libraries of Hengwrt, and of Jesus College (English translation).
- Rhys, John (1904), Celtic Britain (3rd ed.), London: Society for Promoting Christian Knowledge
- Skene, William Forbes (1868), The Four Ancient Books of Wales, vol. I, Edinburgh: Edmonston and Douglas
- Stephens, Thomas (1876), Evans, D. Silvan (ed.), The Literature of the Kymry (Second ed.), London: Longmans, Green, and Co.
- Williams, Edward (Iolo Morganwg) (1848), Williams (ab Iolo), Taliesin (ed.), Iolo Manuscripts, Llandovery: William Rees
- Williams, John (1844), The Ecclesiastical Antiquities of the Cymry, London: W. J. Cleaver

Regnal titles
Preceded by Cadwallon Lawhir ap Einion	King of Gwynedd c. 571 – c. 598	Succeeded by Rhun Hir ap Maelgwn
Legendary titles
Preceded by Vortiporius	King of Britain	Succeeded by Keredic
