= Sub-Roman Britain =

Period in late antiquity in Great Britain

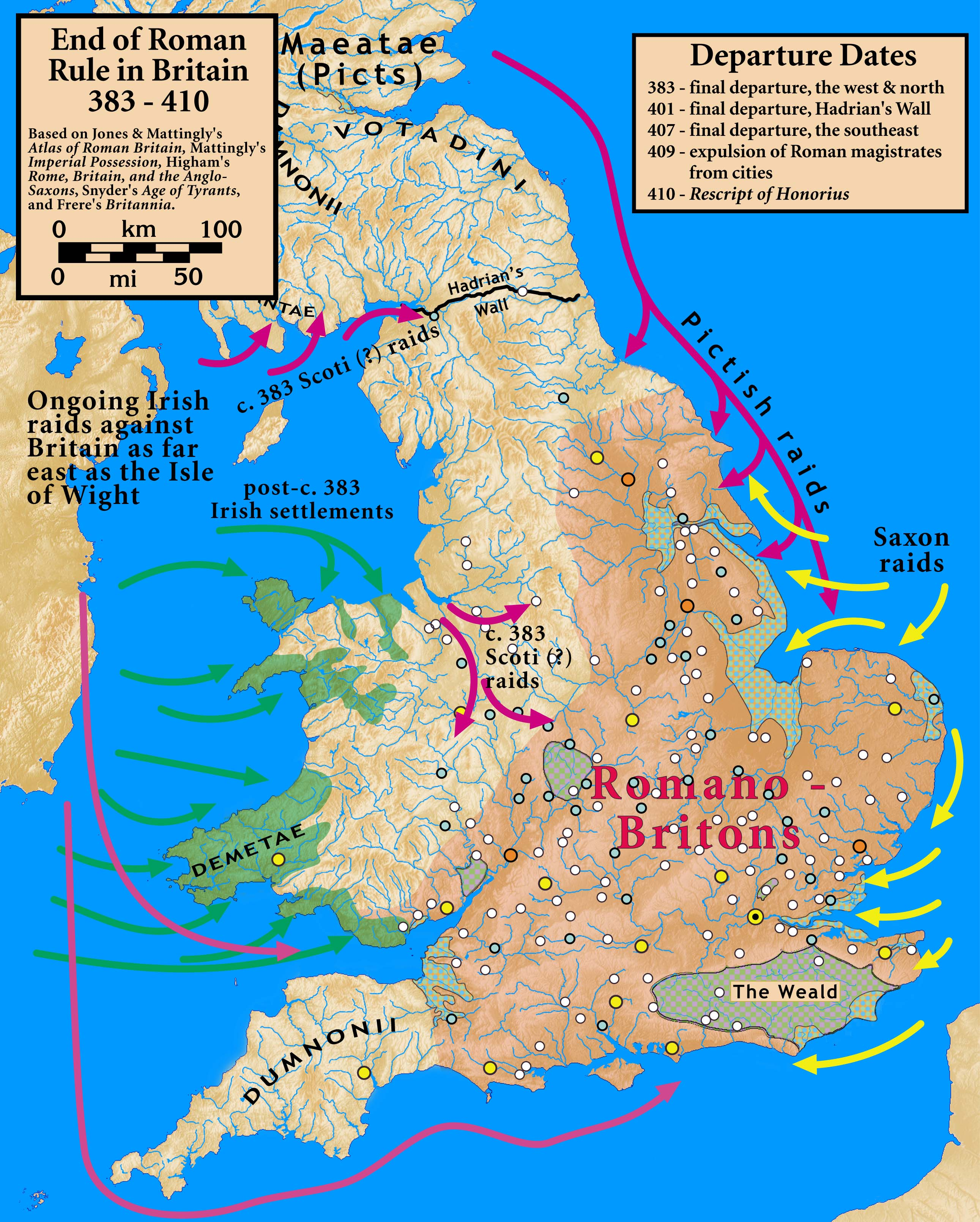
The end of Roman rule in Britain

Sub-Roman Britain, also called post-Roman Britain or Dark Age Britain, is the period of Late Antiquity in Great Britain between the end of Roman rule and the founding of Anglo-Saxon kingdoms. The term was originally used to describe archaeological remains found in 5th- and 6th-century AD sites that hinted at the decay of locally made wares from a previous higher standard under the Roman Empire. It is now used to describe the period that began with the recall of Roman troops from Britannia to Gaul by Constantine III in 407 and ended with the Battle of Deorham in 577. This period has attracted a great deal of academic and popular debate, in part because of the lack of written records from the time.

== Meaning of terms ==
The period of sub-Roman Britain traditionally covers the history of the parts of Britain that had been under Roman rule from the end of Roman imperial rule, traditionally dated to be in 410, to the arrival of Saint Augustine in 597. The date taken for the end of this period is arbitrary in that the sub-Roman culture continued in northern England until the merger of Rheged (the kingdom of the Brigantes) with Northumbria by dynastic marriage in 633, and longer in the west of Britain, and Cornwall, Cumbria and Wales especially.

The term "post-Roman Britain" is also used for the period; "sub-Roman" and "post-Roman" are terms that apply to the old Roman province of Britannia, i.e. Britain south of the Forth–Clyde line. The history of the area between Hadrian's Wall and the Forth–Clyde line is similar to that of Wales (see Rheged, Bernicia, Gododdin and Strathclyde). North of the line lay a thinly populated area including the kingdoms of the Maeatae (in Angus), Dalriada (in Argyll), and the kingdom whose kaer (castle) near Inverness was visited by Saint Columba. The Romans referred to these peoples collectively as Picti, meaning 'Painted Ones'.

The term "late antiquity", implying wider horizons, is finding more use in the academic community, especially when transformations of classical culture common throughout the post-Roman West are examined. The period may also be considered as part of the early Middle Ages, if continuity with the following periods is stressed. Popular (and some academic) works use a range of more dramatic names for the period: the Dark Ages, the Brythonic Age, the Age of Tyrants, or the Age of Arthur.

== Written accounts ==
Little extant written material is available from this period, though a considerable amount from later periods may be relevant. A lot of what is available deals with the first few decades of the 5th century only. The sources can usefully be classified into British and continental, and into contemporary and non-contemporary.

Two primary contemporary British sources exist: the Confessio of Saint Patrick and Gildas' De Excidio et Conquestu Britanniae (On the Ruin and Conquest of Britain). Patrick's Confessio and his Letter to Coroticus reveal aspects of life in Britain, from where he was abducted to Ireland. It is particularly useful in highlighting the state of Christianity at the time. Gildas is the nearest to a source of sub-Roman history, but there are many problems in using it; the document represents British history as he and his audience understood it. Though a few other documents of the period do exist, such as Gildas' letters on monasticism, they are not directly relevant to British history. Gildas' De Excidio is a jeremiad: it is written as a polemic to warn contemporary rulers against sin, demonstrating through historical and biblical examples that bad rulers are always punished by God – in the case of Britain, through the destructive wrath of the Saxon invaders. The historical section of De Excidio is short, and the material in it is clearly selected with Gildas' purpose in mind. There are no absolute dates given, and some of the details, such as those regarding the Hadrian's and Antonine Walls are clearly wrong. Nevertheless, Gildas does provide us with an insight into some of the kingdoms that existed when he was writing, and how an educated monk perceived the situation that had developed between the Anglo-Saxons and the Britons.

More continental contemporary sources mention Britain, although their information is sparse and open to question. The Historia Nova of Byzantine scholar Zosimus notes in passing that western Emperor Honorius, in the throes of Alaric's invasion in 410, sent a rescript to British cities that they must look to their own defence. Some historians have suggested that the reference was instead to Bruttium, but Gildas describes Britain receiving just such a message. The Gallic chronicles, Chronica Gallica of 452 and Chronica Gallica of 511, say prematurely that "Britain, abandoned by the Romans, passed into the power of the Saxons" and provide information about Saint Germanus and his visit or visits to Britain, though again this text has received considerable academic deconstruction. The work of Procopius, another 6th-century Byzantine writer, makes some references to Britain, though the accuracy of these is uncertain.

Numerous later written sources claim to provide accurate accounts of the period. The first to attempt this was the monk Bede, writing in the early 8th century. He based his account of the sub-Roman period in his Historia ecclesiastica gentis Anglorum (written around 731) heavily on Gildas, though he tried to provide dates for the events Gildas describes. It was written from an anti-Briton point of view. Later sources, such as the Historia Brittonum often attributed to Nennius, the Anglo-Saxon Chronicle (again written from a non-Briton point of view, based on West Saxon sources) and the Annales Cambriae, are all heavily shrouded in myth and can only be used with caution as evidence for this period. There are also documents giving Welsh poetry (of Taliesin and Aneirin) and land deeds (Llandaff charters) that appear to date back to the 6th century.

After the Norman Conquest there were many books written that purport to give the history of the sub-Roman period. These have been influenced by the fictionalised account in Geoffrey of Monmouth's Historia Regum Britanniae (History of the Kings of Britain). Therefore, they can only be regarded as showing how the legends grew. Not until modern times have serious studies of the period been undertaken. Later Lives of Celtic saints, although often unreliable, do provide some insights into life in sub-Roman Britain. For example, there is a description of a dilapidated but still occupied Roman villa near Chepstow (probably at Portskewett) included in an account of a visit by Saint Tatheus; and the Roman ruins of Carlisle, as they were in 685, are described in a Life of Saint Cuthbert.

== Archaeological evidence ==
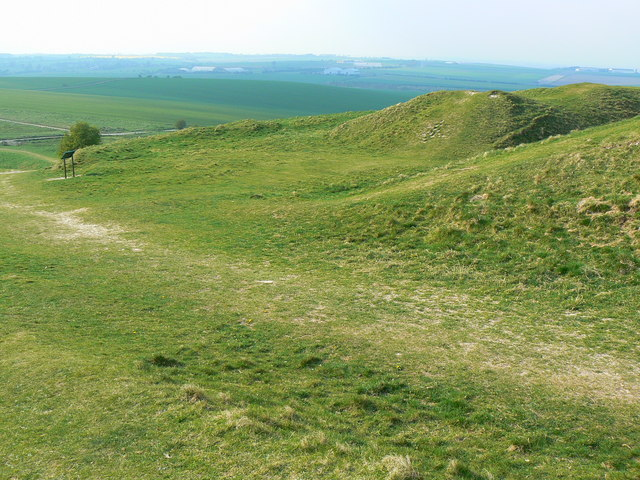
Barbury Castle, a 6th-century hillfort in Wiltshire

Archaeology provides further evidence for this period, in some cases suggesting that the depopulation of Roman towns and the development of villa and estate organization was already occurring in the 4th century. The 5th and 6th centuries in Britain are marked by a sharp discontinuity in town life, with the exception of a few sites such as Londinium, Eboracum, Canterbury and Wroxeter, but the discontinuity in the episcopate also suggests a decline in town life. The Roman villa system, represented by some 500 archaeological sites, did not survive either; unlike Gaul, in Britain no villa names survived into the Germanic period. However, at Chedworth, building work continued: a mosaic within Room 28, discovered in 2020, was designed and created in the middle of the 5th century.

In the sub-Roman period, building in stone gradually came to an end; buildings were constructed of less durable materials than during the Roman period. However, brooches, pottery, and weapons from this period have survived. The study of burials and cremations, and the grave goods associated with these, has done much to expand the understanding of cultural identities in the period. Archaeology has shown some evidence of continuity with Roman education, trade with the Mediterranean, and with Celtic art. Archaeological excavations in south Wales in 2023 sought evidence of an early medieval monastery and school said to have been founded by Saint Illtud in the early 6th century, the forerunner of St Illtyd's Church, Llantwit Major (c.1100).

Excavations of settlements have revealed possible changes in social structures, and the extent to which life in Britain continued unaltered in certain pockets into the early medieval period. Hilltops (the so-called "hillforts"), castra, and monasteries have been excavated. Work on towns has been particularly important. Work on the hillforts has shown evidence of refurbishment and also of overseas trade. One of the earliest major excavations was at Tintagel (Radford 1939). This uncovered rectangular structures and much Mediterranean pottery. The buildings were initially interpreted as a monastery but later as a princely stronghold and trading post. Another important excavation was at Dinas Powys (Alcock 1963) which showed evidence of metalworking. Alcock also led the excavations at South Cadbury (Alcock 1995). Many other sites have now been shown to have been occupied during the sub-Roman period, including Birdoswald and Saxon Shore forts. Work on field systems and environmental archaeology has also highlighted how much agricultural practice continued and changed over the period. Archaeology has confirmed Germanic burials at Bowcombe and Gatcombe on the Isle of Wight that took place at least 50 years before the dates suggested by historical sources, concurrent with Honorius's award of land in Gallia Aquitania to the Visigoths in 418. There is archaeological evidence of Anglo-Saxons and Britons living on the same site. For example, in the cemetery at Wasperton, Warwickshire, there is evidence of a family adopting Anglo-Saxon culture over a long period.

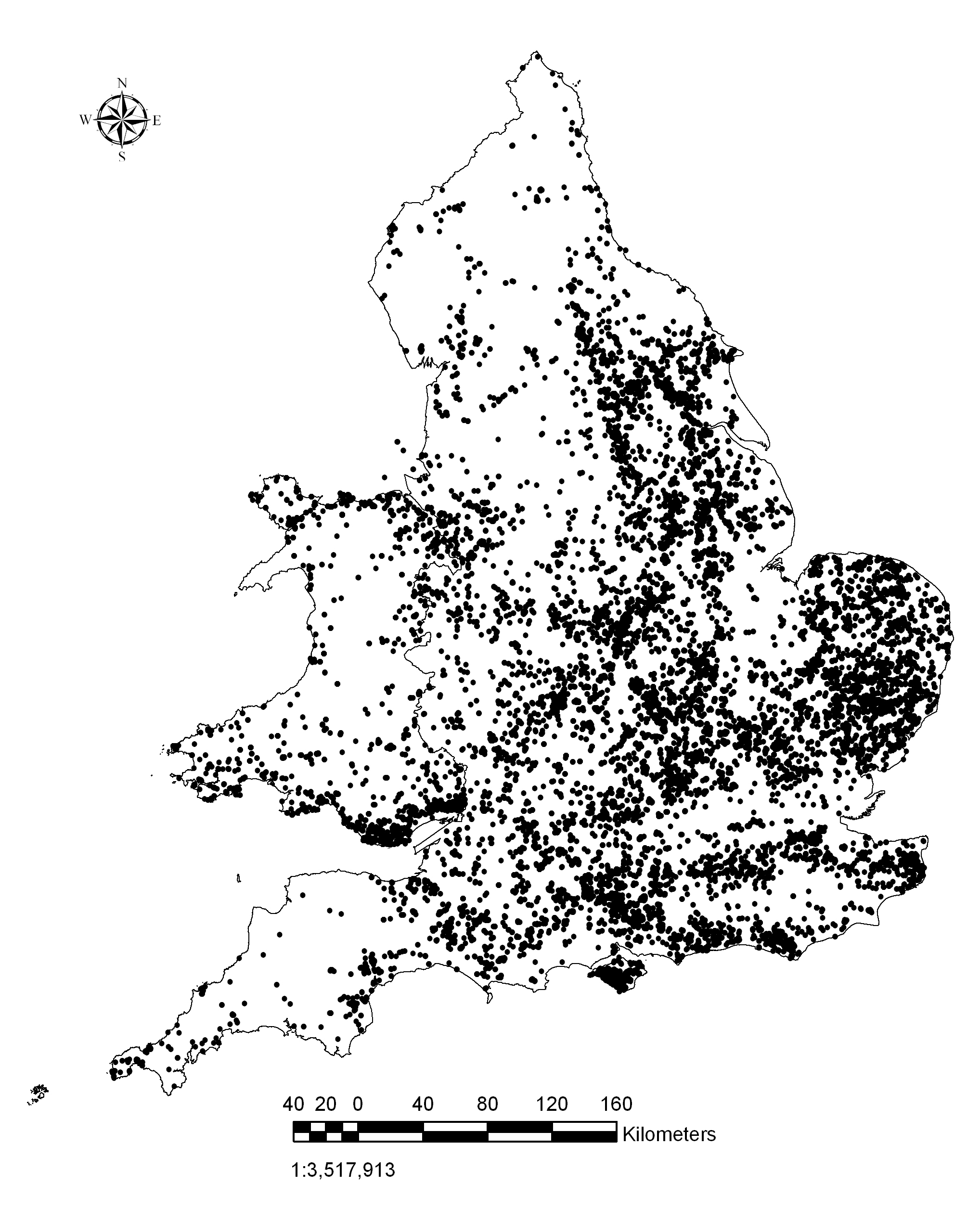
Roman coins findings clearly indicate the areas of greatest "Romanization" and presence in Roman Britain.

Although radiocarbon dating can provide a rough estimate, this is not accurate enough to associate archaeological finds with historical events. Dendrochronology depends on the presence of suitable pieces of wood. Coins are often the most useful tool for dating, but no newly minted coins are believed to have entered circulation in Britain after the very early 5th century.

== End of Roman rule ==
The proximate cause of the end of Roman rule in Britannia appears to have been a power struggle between aristocrats and Stilicho, a Roman general and strongman of the Roman Empire. In order to protect Italy from invasions by the Visigoths, Stilicho had seriously depleted the Roman forces defending the Limes Germanicus. In the summer of 406 there was a rebellion of legionarii in Britain that resulted in the acclamation of several usurpers in quick succession as imperator, a declaration of rebellion against the ruling emperor. The last of these, Constantine III, crossed the English Channel at Bononia and took with him all of the mobile troops left in Britain, thus denuding the province of any first-line military protection. The Roman forces in Gaul declared for him, followed by most of those in Hispania. On 31 December 406 the Vandals, Burgundians, Alans and Sueves crossed the Rhine and overran the Limes Germanicus. Meanwhile, there were barbarian raids on Britain in 408, but these seem to have been defeated. After 410 Honorius apparently sent letters to the cities of Britain telling them to fend for themselves, though this is sometimes disputed.

From the middle of the 5th century the Germanic raiders began to settle in the eastern river valleys. Later civil wars seem to have broken out, which have been interpreted either as being between pro-Roman and independence groups or between "Established Church" and Pelagian parties, a class struggle between peasants and land owners, or a coup by an urban elite. A recent view sees Britain fragmenting into kingdoms based on British tribal identities. Life seems to have continued much as before in the countryside and on a reduced scale in the towns as evidenced by the descriptions of Germanus' visits. It appears that while Roman cities and towns decreased in size, they retained administrative and symbolic importance for new polities.

Gildas says that a "council" was convened by Vortigern to find ways of countering the barbarian threat. The council opted to hire Saxon mercenaries, following Roman practice. After a while these turned against the British and plundered the towns. British leader Ambrosius Aurelianus fought against them in a number of battles apparently over a long period. Towards the end of this period was the Battle of Mons Badonicus around 490, which later sources claim was won by King Arthur, though Gildas does not identify him. After this there was a long period of peace. The British seem to have been in control of England and Wales roughly west of a line from York to Bournemouth. The Saxons had control of eastern areas in an arc from East Yorkshire through Lincolnshire and perhaps Nottinghamshire, to East Anglia and South East England.

Writing in Latin, perhaps about 540, Gildas gives an account of the history of Britain, but the earlier part (for which other sources are available) is severely muddled. He castigates five rulers in western Britain – Constantine of Dumnonia, Aurelius Caninus, Vortipor of the Demetae, Cuneglasus and Maglocunus – for their sins. He also attacks the British clergy. He gives information on the British diet, dress and entertainment. He writes that Britons were killed, emigrated or enslaved but gives no numbers.

In the late 6th century there was another period of Saxon expansion, starting with the capture of Searoburh in 552 by the dynasty that later ruled Wessex, and including entry into the Cotswolds area after the Battle of Deorham (577), though the accuracy of the entries in the Anglo-Saxon Chronicle for this period has been questioned. These conquests are often said by modern writers, on no clear evidence, to have separated the Britons of South West England (known later as the West Welsh) from those of Wales. (Just after the period being discussed, the Battle of Chester in 611 might have separated the latter from those of the north of England.) Until the 570s, Britons were still in control of about half of England and Wales.

== Kingdoms ==
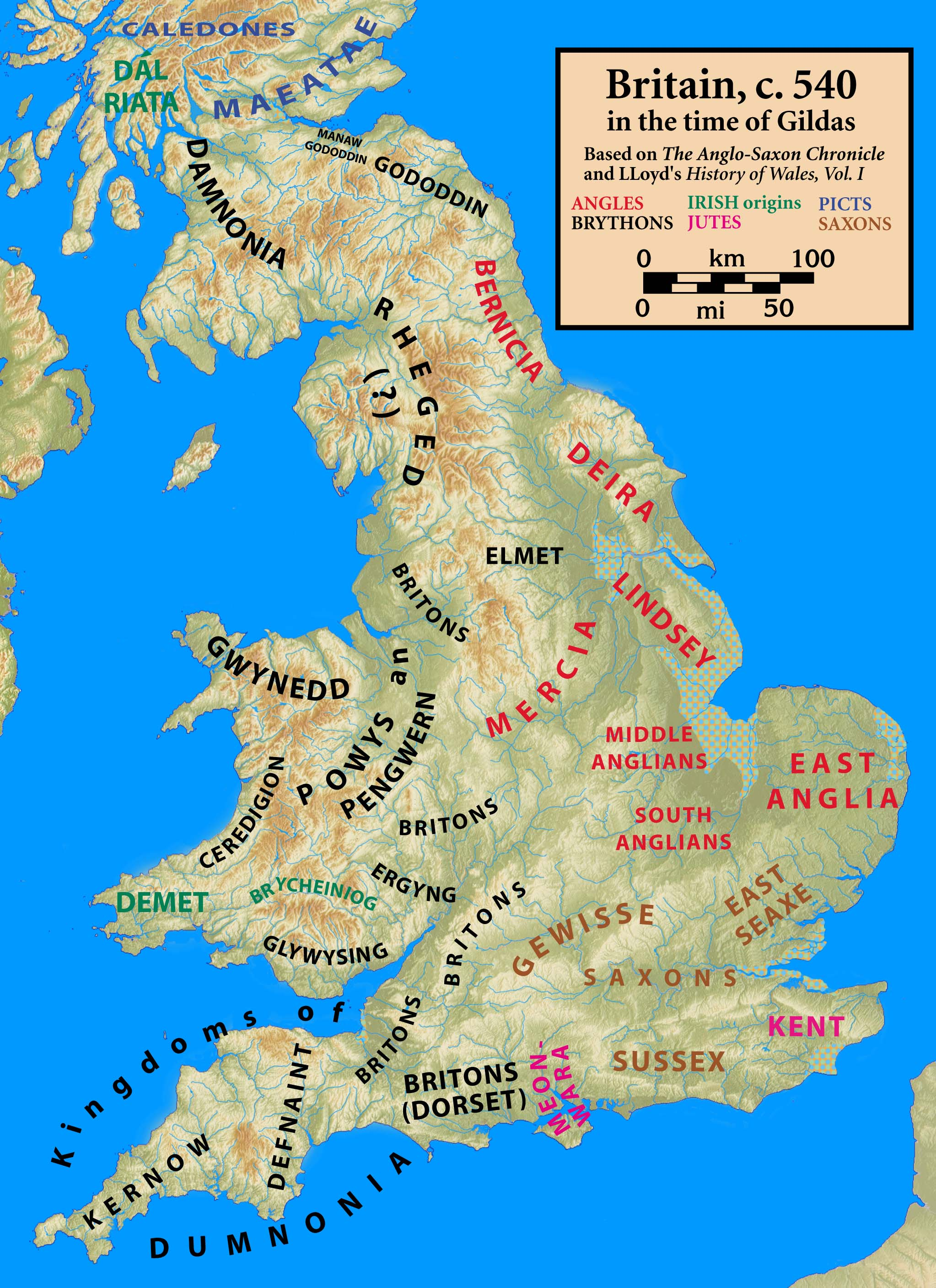
Britain c. 540, in the time of Gildas

Various Celtic kingdoms existed at some point in the period. Some changed their names and some were absorbed by others. Not all of their names, especially in the southeast, are known, nor are the details of their political development; some authority structures left from the Roman period may have continued in charge of some areas for some time. At times some of the kingdoms were united by a ruler who was an overlord, while wars occurred between others. During the period the boundaries are likely to have changed. The major ones were:

- Bryneich – Northumberland; eventually taken by the Angles of Bernicia
- Dumnonia – south west England, Cornwall and much of Devon
- Dyfed – south west Wales
- Ergyng – south west Herefordshire, northern Monmouthshire and the Forest of Dean, Gloucestershire
- Gwent, Brycheiniog and Glywysing – south Wales
- Powys – mid Wales
- Gwynedd – north Wales
- Elmet – south west Yorkshire
- Rheged – Cumbria and Lancashire
- Ebrauc – around York and northern Yorkshire
- Strathclyde – (c. 900 – c. 1100) in south west Scotland, Cumberland, Westmorland
- Gododdin – centred on Traprain Law in Lothian

Some areas fell under the domination of Anglian or Saxon chieftains, later kingdoms:

- Bernicia – the Anglian kingdom of Bernicia before joining with Deira to become Northumbria
- Deira – the Anglian kingdom of Deira before joining with Bernicia to become Northumbria (East Yorkshire)
- Lindsey – the Anglian kingdom of Lindsey before joining with Northumbria and Mercia
- East Anglia – including Suffolk and Norfolk
- Kent
- Hwicce – most of Gloucestershire except the Forest of Dean and western Oxfordshire.
- Sussex – including the settlement of Haestingas, containing people of possibly Jutish origin
- Essex – including Middlesex and Surrey
- Wessex – formed from areas in the upper Thames Valley and later incorporating an area of Jutish settlement in the Meon Valley and around Southampton (including the Isle of Wight)
- Mercia – centred on Repton
- Middle Anglia – east Midlands, later joined with Mercia
- Northumbria – formed from Bernicia and Deira
- Wihtwara

== Religion ==
Officially the Roman Empire was Christian at the start of the 5th century, but there is evidence of rural pagan temples being refurbished at the start of this period in western England. However, the temples seem to have been gradually replaced by Christian churches on the same site or nearby. "Celtic" churches or monasteries seem to have flourished during this period in the British areas, such as that at Glastonbury, though mostly not until the 6th century; but the Saxons were pagan. This reinforced a great antipathy between the peoples. Many Roman cemeteries continued into much later times, such as that at Cannington, Somerset. In the east, there was a gradual transition among the pagan Saxons from cremation to inhumation. Although the arrival of Saint Augustine is traditionally seen as the significant Christianising event for the Saxons, a bishop had already arrived in Kent with the king's Merovingian wife. Other Saxons remained pagan after this time.

In 429 British Deacon Palladius had requested support from the pope in Rome to combat Pelagianism. Bishops Germanus and Lupus of Troyes were sent. Germanus, a former military commander, is reported to have led the British to the "Hallelujah" victory, possibly in Wales or Herefordshire. Germanus is said to have made a second visit to England later. Participation by a British bishop at a synod in Gaul demonstrates that at least some British churches were in full administrative and doctrinal touch with Gaul as late as 455.

In the north, Whithorn is said to be the earliest church in Scotland, being founded in 397 by Saint Ninian. Coroticus (or Ceretic) was an apostate Pict king who was the recipient of the letter from Saint Patrick. His base may have been Dumbarton Rock on the River Clyde, and his descendant Rhydderch Hael is named in the Life of Saint Columba. Rhydderch was a contemporary of Áedán mac Gabráin of Dal Riata and Urien of Rheged in the late 6th century, as well as of Æthelfrith of Bernicia. Unlike Columba, Kentigern, the supposed apostle to the Britons of the Clyde and alleged founder of Glasgow, is a shadowy figure.

== Anglo-Saxon migration ==
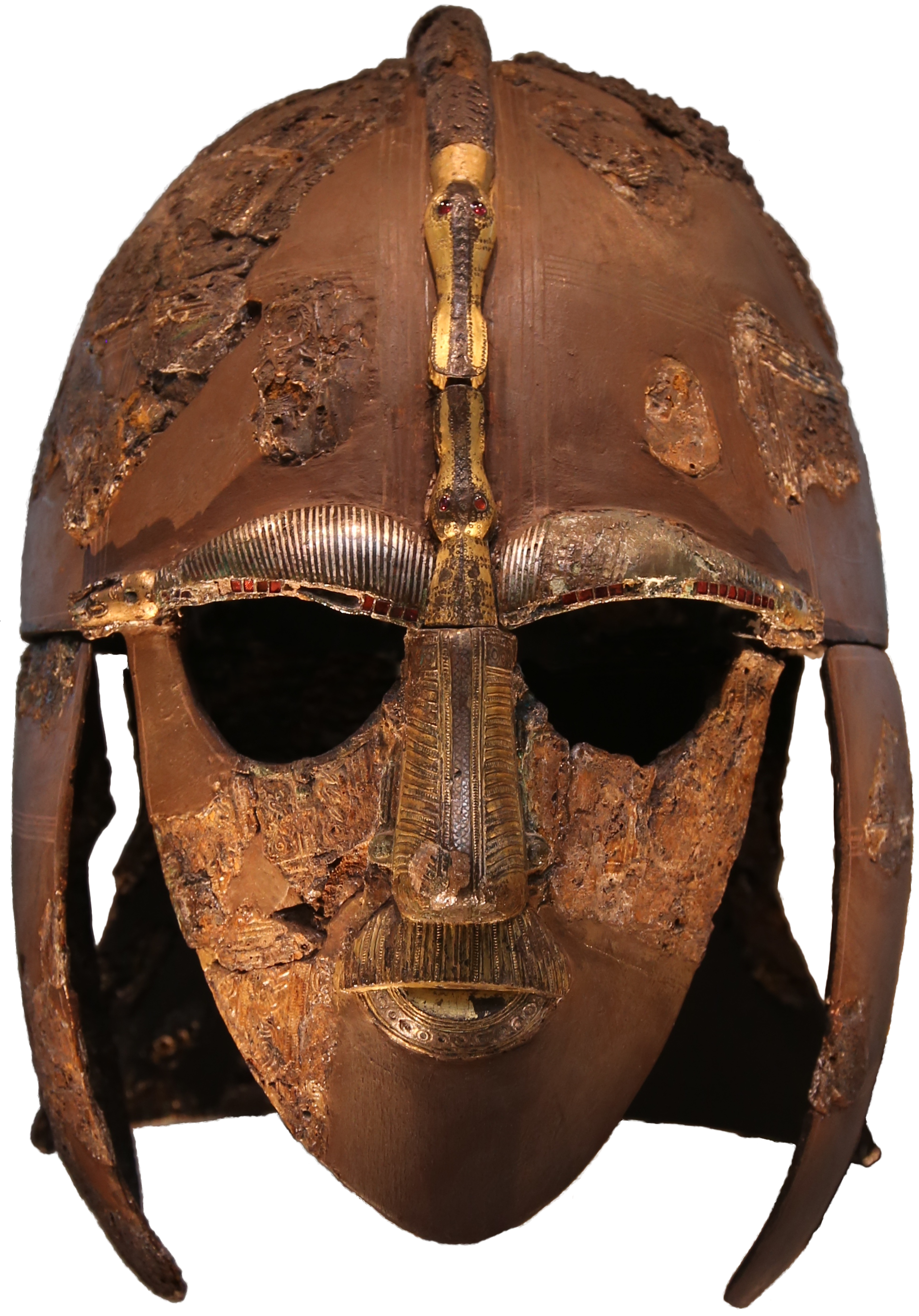
The famous Sutton Hoo helmet, 7th century

=== Linguistic evidence ===
Linguistics is useful in the analysis of culture and to an extent political associations. Bede in Historia ecclesiastica gentis Anglorum (completed in 731) wrote that "currently, [there are in Britain] the languages of five peoples, namely that of the Angles (English), the Britons (Brittonic), the Scots (Gaelic), the Picts and the Latins" (HE 1.1). A review of the changes in the Brythonic language during this period is given by Kenneth H. Jackson. Studies of Old English, P- and Q-Celtic, and Latin have provided evidence for contact among the Britons, the Gaels, and the Anglo-Saxons. The consensus is that Old English has little evidence of linguistic contact. Some scholars have suggested that there is more evidence in the grammar than in the lexicon, though this is challenged by many. Latin continued to be used for writing but the extent of its use for speech has been much disputed.

Similarly, studies of place names give clues about the linguistic history of an area. England (except Cornwall and Cumbria) shows patchy evidence now of Celtic in its place names. There are scattered Celtic place names throughout, increasing towards the west. There are also Celtic river names and topographical names. An explanation of the toponymic and linguistic evidence is that Anglo-Saxon language and culture became dominant due to their political and social preeminence in the south and east of Britain. Names with a Latin element may suggest continuity of settlement, while some places are named for pagan Germanic deities. Names of British origin may or may not indicate survival of a British population. Names based on the Anglo-Saxon word for the British, wealh, are also taken as indicating British survival. An example is Walton, meaning settlement of the British and this name is found in many parts of England, though it sometimes means Wall-town.

Surviving inscriptions on stones provide another source of information on the settlements of Britons and the Anglo-Saxons. Celtic inscribed stones from this period occur in western England, Wales and southern Scotland. Inscriptions in parts of Scotland, Wales, and Cornwall, are in ogham, some containing forms which scholars have not been able to understand.

=== Extent of the migrations ===
Two contrasting models of the end of sub-Roman Britain have been described by Richard Reece as "decline and immigration" and "invasion and displacement". It has long been held that the Anglo-Saxons migrated to Britain in large numbers in the 5th and 6th centuries, substantially displacing the British people. The Anglo-Saxon historian Frank Stenton in 1943, although making considerable allowance for British survival, essentially sums up this view, arguing "that the greater part of southern England was overrun in the first phase of the war". This interpretation was based on the written sources, particularly Gildas but also the later sources such as the Anglo-Saxon historian Bede, that cast the arrival of the Anglo-Saxons as a violent event. The toponymic and linguistic evidence was also considered to support this interpretation, as very few British place names survived in eastern Britain, very few British Celtic words entered the Old English language and the Brythonic language and peoples migrated from south-western Britain to Armorica, which eventually became Brittany. This interpretation particularly appealed to earlier English historians, who wanted to further their view that England had developed differently from mainland Europe, with a limited monarchy and love of liberty. This, it was argued, came from the mass Anglo-Saxon invasions. While this view was never universal – Edward Gibbon believed that there had been a great deal of British survival – it was the dominant paradigm. Though many scholars would now employ this argument, the traditional view is still held by many other historians, Lawrence James writing in 2002 that England was "submerged by an Anglo-Saxon current which swept away the Romano-British."

The traditional view has been partly deconstructed (considerably in some circles) since the 1990s, with a reduction in the numbers of Anglo-Saxons believed to have arrived in Britain. A lower figure is sometimes accepted, which would mean that it is highly unlikely that the existing British population was substantially displaced by the Anglo-Saxons. If fewer Anglo-Saxons arrived, it is proposed that they formed a ruling elite, with acculturation of the local population. Thus some "Saxon" graves may be of Britons, though many scholars disagree.

Two genetic studies published in 2016, using data from ancient burials found in Cambridgeshire, Yorkshire and Durham, found that the ancestry of the modern-day English population contained substantial contributions from the Anglo-Saxon and Celtic peoples.

== End of Roman Britain ==
Various dates have been proposed to mark the end of Roman Britain, including the end of Roman currency coinage importation in 402, Constantine III's rebellion in 407, the rebellion mentioned by Zosimus in 409, and the Rescript of Honorius in 410. Unlike modern decolonisation, the dating of the end of Roman Britain is complex, and the exact process is unknown.

There is some controversy as to why Roman rule ended in Britain. The view first advocated by Theodor Mommsen was that Rome left Britain. This argument was substantiated over time, most recently by A.S. Esmonde-Cleary. According to this argument, internal turmoil in the Roman Empire and the need to withdraw troops to fight off barbarian armies led Rome to abandon Britain. It was the collapse of the imperial system that led to the end of imperial rule in Britain. However, Michael Jones has advanced an alternative thesis that argues that Rome did not leave Britain, but that Britain left Rome. He highlights the numerous usurpers who came from Britain in the late 4th and early 5th centuries, and points out that the supply of coinage to Britain had dried up by the early 5th century, so that administrators and troops were not getting paid. All of this, he argues, led the British people to rebel against Rome. These arguments are open to criticism, and the question is still open.

It was a violent period, and there was probably widespread tension, alluded to in all the written sources. This may have led to the deaths of many Britons. There are also references to plagues. Laycock (Britannia the Failed State, 2008) suggests tribal conflict, possibly even starting before 410, may have sliced up much of Britain and helped destroy the economy. The evidence from land use suggests a decline in production, which might be a sign of population decline.

It is clear that some British people migrated to elsewhere in Europe, and Armorica in northwest Gaul became known as Brittany. There is also evidence of British migration to Gallaecia, in Hispania. The dates of these migrations are uncertain, but recent studies suggest that the migration from south western Britain to Brittany may have begun as early as 300 and had largely ended by 500. These settlers, unlikely to be refugees if the date was this early, made their presence felt in the naming of the westernmost, Atlantic-facing provinces of Armorica, Kerne/Cornouaille ("Kernow/Cornwall") and Domnonea ("Devon"). However, there is clear linguistic evidence for close contact between the south west of Britain and Brittany across the sub-Roman period.

In Galicia, in the north west corner of the Iberian Peninsula, another region of traditional Celtic culture, the Suebian Parochiale, drawn up about 580, includes a list of the principal churches of each diocese in the metropolitanate of Braga: the ecclesia Britonensis, now Bretoña (north of Lugo), which was the seat of a bishop who ministered to the spiritual needs of the British immigrants to northwestern Spain: in 572 the bishop, Mailoc, had a Celtic name. The settlers had brought their Celtic Christianity with them but finally accepted the Latin Church's jurisdiction at the Fourth Council of Toledo in 633. The diocese stretched from Ferrol to the Eo River. In Spain, the area has sometimes been dubbed "the third Britain" or "the last Britain".

Non-Anglo-Saxon kingdoms began appearing in western Britain, and are first referred to in Gildas' De Excidio. To an extent these kingdoms may have derived from Roman structures. But it is also clear that they drew on a strong influence from Hibernia, which was never part of the Roman Empire. Archaeology has helped further the study of these kingdoms, notably at sites like Tintagel or the hillfort at South Cadbury.

In the north there developed the British kingdoms of the Hen Ogledd, the "Old North", comprising Ebrauc (probable name), Bryneich, Rheged, Strathclyde, Elmet and Gododdin. 5th- and 6th-century repairs along Hadrian's Wall have been uncovered, and at Whithorn in south western Scotland (possibly the site of Ninian's monastery). Chance discoveries have helped document the continuing urban occupation of some Roman towns such as Wroxeter and Caerwent. Continued urban use might be associated with an ecclesiastical structure.

Western Britain has attracted those archaeologists who wish to place King Arthur as a historical figure. Though there is little contemporary written evidence for this, archaeological evidence does suggest that a Romano-British king might have wielded considerable power during the sub-Roman period, as demonstrated by the creation of sites such as Tintagel and earthworks such as the Wansdyke. Such interpretations continue to attract the popular imagination and the scepticism of academics.

While pushed back politically and linguistically, British scholars and ecclesiastics had a significant impact on the Anglo-Saxon newcomers through literacy, ecclesiastical social constructs and historical memory of the Roman period in Britain, particularly after the Christianizing of the Anglo-Saxons. Coming from a fully oral cultural background, the Anglo-Saxons were heavily influenced by the more developed Christianized and literate culture of the Britons. British scholars were often employed at Anglo-Saxon courts to assist in the management of the kingdoms. This reintroduced British culture to those parts of Britain lost to the British politically. The epitome of this process is the adoption of the legendary British war leader, King Arthur, as the national hero of the English, due to the literary work of Welsh historians.

== Environmental change effects ==
There is evidence for climate change in the 5th century, with conditions turning cooler and wetter. This shortened the growing season and made uplands unsuited to growing grain. Dendrochronology reveals a particular climatic event in 540. Michael Jones suggests that declining agricultural production from land that was already fully exploited had considerable demographic consequences.

== Population fluctuation ==
=== Theories for reduction ===
==== Background ====
Slaves were important in the economy and the army in the Roman Empire. Estimates for the prevalence of slavery in the Roman Empire vary: some estimate that around 30% of the population of the Empire in the 1st century was enslaved. A more recent study suggests 10–15% even for the early empire "as any greater estimate would require implausible levels of transformation in a pre-modern context." The difference the lower percentage in the Later Roman Empire can be attributed to fewer slaves in sub-elite households and agricultural estates (replaced by a great expansion in various types of tenancy). The Germanic region was one of the main sources of slaves. It was mainly wholesale dealers, who followed the Roman armies, who sold slaves. After the Empire expanded, there were fewer places to obtain slaves. Around 210, piracy increased around the North Sea and boosted the supply, taken from villages in that area, along with those captured for ransom.

Britain was not easily defensible. It did not pay completely the costs of occupation. Nevertheless, the Romans were forced to keep three or four legions, 30,000 to 40,000 men with auxiliary units in place to defend it. They managed fairly well until the collapse of Roman authority after the garrison was reduced in size by Magnus Maximus in 388 and Stilicho in 401. It seems that after 350 the Roman government was having more difficulty in recruiting soldiers.

In an effort to remedy the situation it resorted to payment instead of provision of recruit, the aurum tironicum. Landowners could pay a set fee to prevent any of their tenants from being pressed into the army (slaves were rarely resorted to even at critical moments in exchange for their freedom). Not enough men wanted to enter military service. The gold from the tax led to a greater use of Germanic or other tribal groups who did not need to be expensively equipped, housed, and paid pensions, as the tax was used to recruit mercenaries as foederati, but it also drained the treasury. Previously foreigners were put into units, the auxilia, officered by Romans. Roman army units, the smaller Later Roman legions, continued to exist but gradually disappeared in the 5th century leaving defence of the Empire to hirelings.

After the Battle of Adrianople, the Gothic foederati, by the Treaty of 382, were allowed to remain with the Empire intact, which reversed the centuries-old Roman policy of destroying barbarian enemies by killing them all, selling them or incorporating them into the Roman army by scattering them across units. The hospitalitas system granted a third of the land (or fees) of a region to barbarians who had invaded and occupied those lands assigned to them. In return, these people declared loyalty to the Emperor and provided military support, whilst retaining their independence. If the theory is correct, Germanic peoples may have been resident in Britain before and after these reforms. One thing led to another to create a spiral.

The policy of substituting mercenaries who were paid in gold which should have gone to support the professional standing army and accommodation to their presence spelled the doom of the Western Empire. The federates, operating from within the boundaries of the Empire, eventually became the new landlords, as there was no professional Roman army to subdue them.

Ancient authors bitterly comment on this series of policy mistakes. The East which relied far less on mercenaries escaped Britain's fate. The Britons in the decades after 410 repeated the mistakes the emperors had done with the Visigoths, Burgundians, Sueves, Vandals, and Franks – they invited mercenaries to protect them, then those same mercenaries subsequently took control over Britain.

==== Plague of Justinian ====
The population of Britain may have decreased by between 1.5 and 3 million after the Roman period, perhaps caused by environmental changes (the Late Antique Little Ice Age) and, subsequently, by plague and smallpox (around 600, the smallpox spread from India into Europe). It is known that the Plague of Justinian entered the Mediterranean world in the 6th century and first arrived in the British Isles in 544 or 545, when it reached Ireland. The later medieval Welsh Lludd and Llefelys mentions a series of three plagues affecting the British of London.

==== Anglo-Saxon settlement ====
According to research led by University College London, Anglo-Saxon settlers could have enjoyed a substantial social and economic advantage over the native Celtic Britons who lived in what is now England, for more than 300 years from the middle of the 5th century. However, this scenario, assuming that the Anglo-Saxons were just Germanic Ingaevones, has been questioned.

==== Minor migrations theories ====
The traditional view about the numbers of Anglo-Saxons arriving in Britain during this period has been deconstructed. Incoming people uniting with the existing population could explain why the island conquest was as slow and incomplete as it was, and why the island was exposed to external attacks by Danish pirates and Normans, as well as other issues about the population composition.

== See also ==
- List of legendary kings of Britain
- Groans of the Britons
- Celtic Christianity
- King of the Britons
- Vortigern
- King Arthur
- Historicity of King Arthur
- Matter of Britain
- Anglo-Saxons
- Anglo-Saxon settlement of Britain
- History of Anglo-Saxon England
- List of Anglo-Welsh wars
- Wansdyke (earthwork)
- England in the Middle Ages
- Heptarchy
- Ancient Britain
- Roman Britain
- Romano-British
- History of the British Isles
- History of Wales
- History of British society
- History of England
- Celt
- Roman Empire

== Notes ==
Preceded by Britannia	Sub-Roman Britain; 410 – c. 550	Succeeded by The Heptarchy; Welsh Kingdoms; Picts
