= Kingdom of Dyfed =

Early medieval Welsh kingdom

Coordinates: 51.9°N 4.7°W

Kingdom of Dyfed Teyrnas Dyfed (Welsh)
- c. 410–920
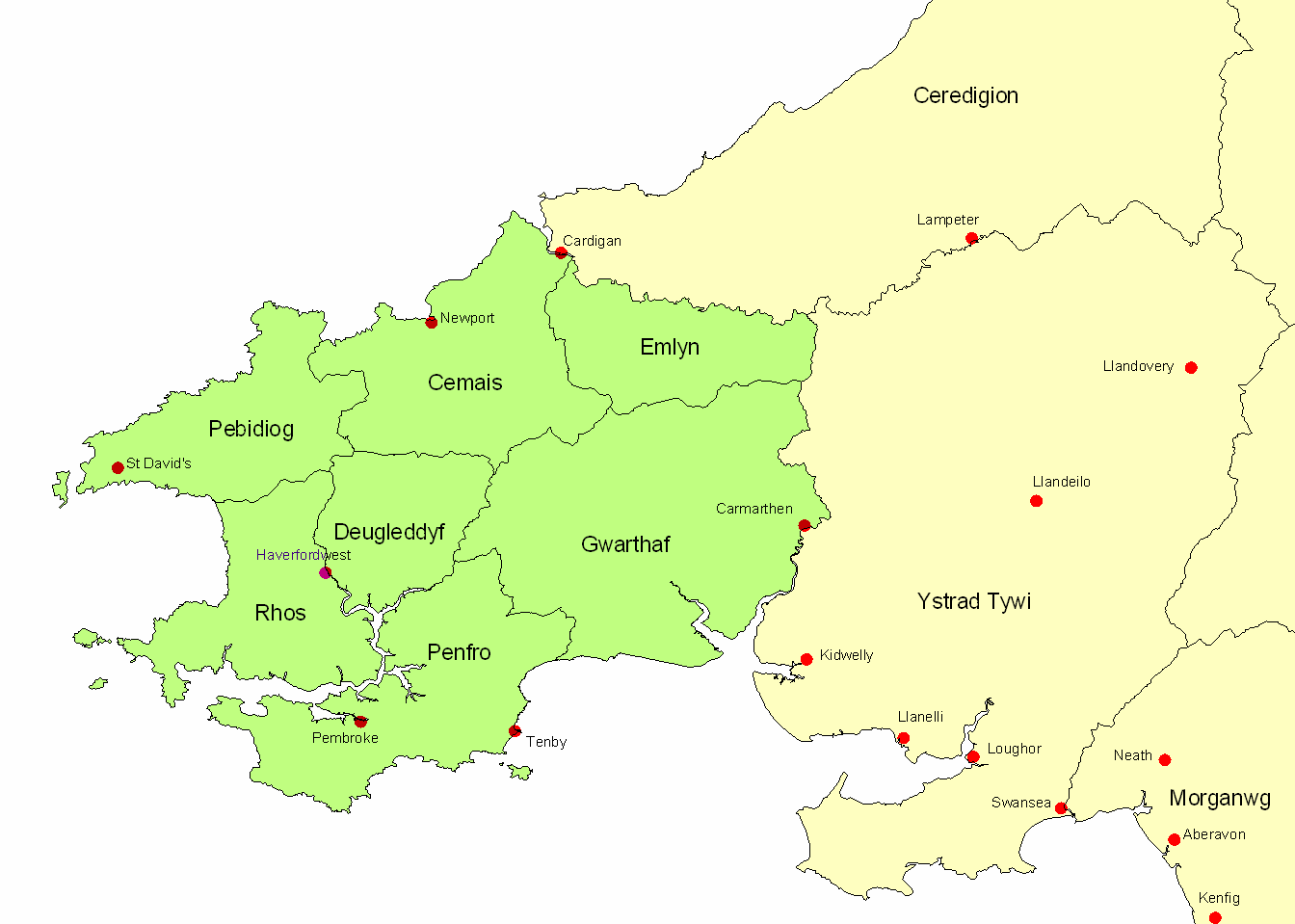
- Map showing Dyfed, after the late 7th century, showing its seven cantrefi.
- Common languages: Welsh, Latin, Irish
- Government: Monarchy
- Historical era: Middle Ages
  - Established: c. 410
  - Disestablished: 920
Preceded by	Succeeded by
Sub-Roman Britain	Deheubarth

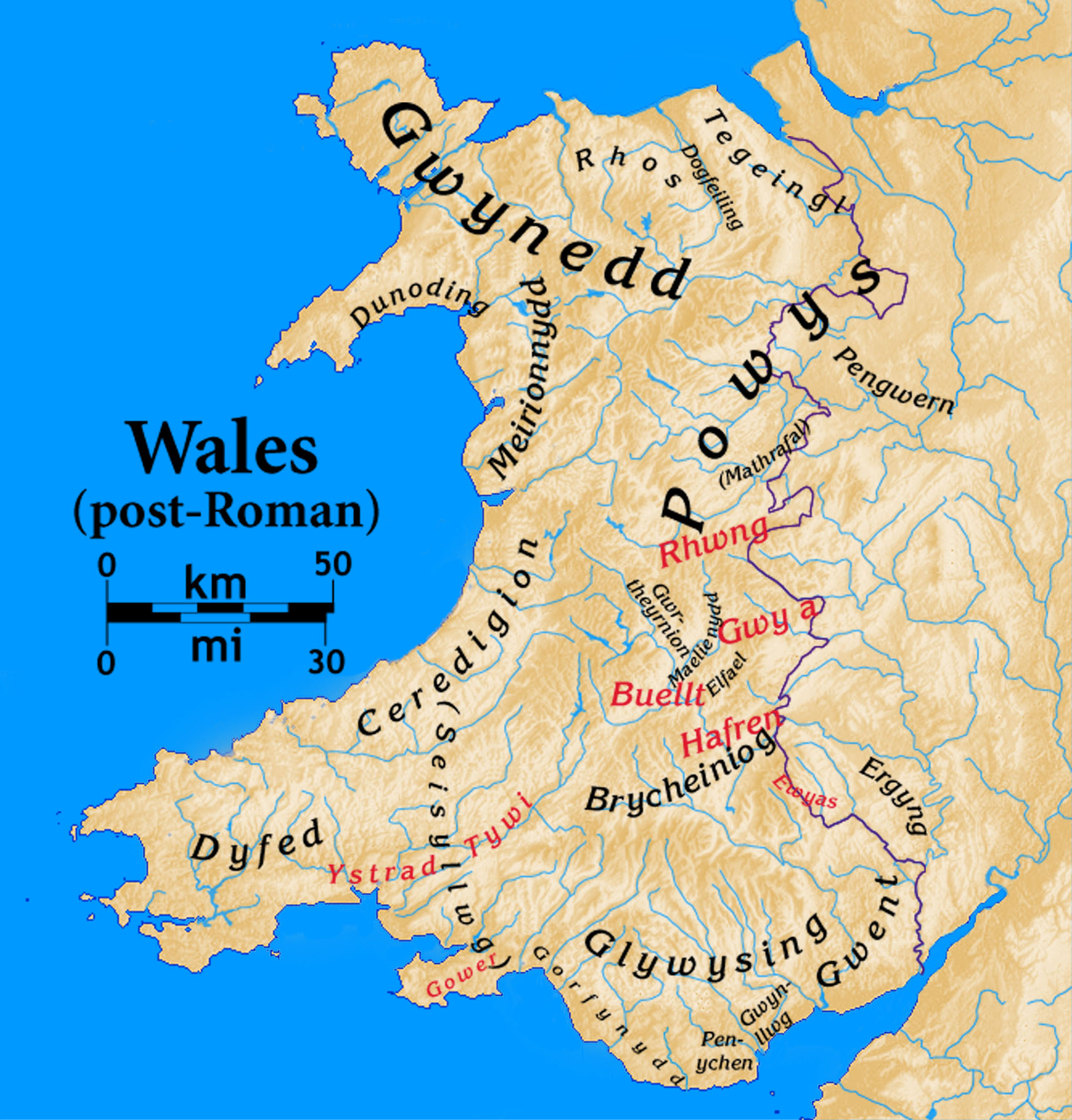
Post-Roman Welsh petty kingdoms. Dyfed is the promontory on the southwestern coast. The modern Anglo-Welsh border is also shown.

The Kingdom of Dyfed (Welsh pronunciation: ['dəvɛd]), one of several Welsh petty kingdoms that emerged in 5th-century sub-Roman Britain in southwest Wales, was based on the former territory of the Demetae (modern Welsh Dyfed). The royal line was founded by Irish settlers in the 5th century. After the Norman invasion of Wales Dyfed was incorporated into Pembrokeshire. The name was resurrected for the now-defunct administrative area called Dyfed as well as in the names of some regional organisations such as Dyfed–Powys Police.

Dyfed may have originally occupied the area that bordered the rivers Teifi, Gwili and Tywi, and included contemporary Pembrokeshire, the western part of contemporary Carmarthenshire, and with the town of Carmarthen. Dyfed eventually comprised at least seven cantrefi: Cemais, Deugleddyf, Emlyn, Cantref Gwarthaf, Pebidiog, Penfro and Rhos, with an approximate area of about 2,284 square kilometres (882 sq mi).

During times of strength, the kingdom expanded to additionally cover the Ystrad Tywi ("Valley of the Tywi"), including Cydweli (Kidwelly) and Gwyr (Gower; possibly under the reign of Aergol Lawhir), and even bordered Brycheiniog. Dyfed lost the Ystrad Tywi region to Ceredigion, another petty kingdom, in the late 7th century.

== History ==
=== Post-Roman foundation and Irish influence ===
While there is little written history in the period following the Roman withdrawal from Britain, lists of the Kings of Dyfed do feature in Medieval sources such as the Harleian genealogies and later genealogies from Jesus College MS 20. These lists start with the semi-legendry figure of Triffyn Farfog and his son and heir, Aergol Lawhir. Triffyn's name may derive from the Latin title tribunus, and he is variously stated to be the son of Owain Fraisg, a descendant of the Roman Emperor Constantine I and the Roman usuper Macsen Wledig.

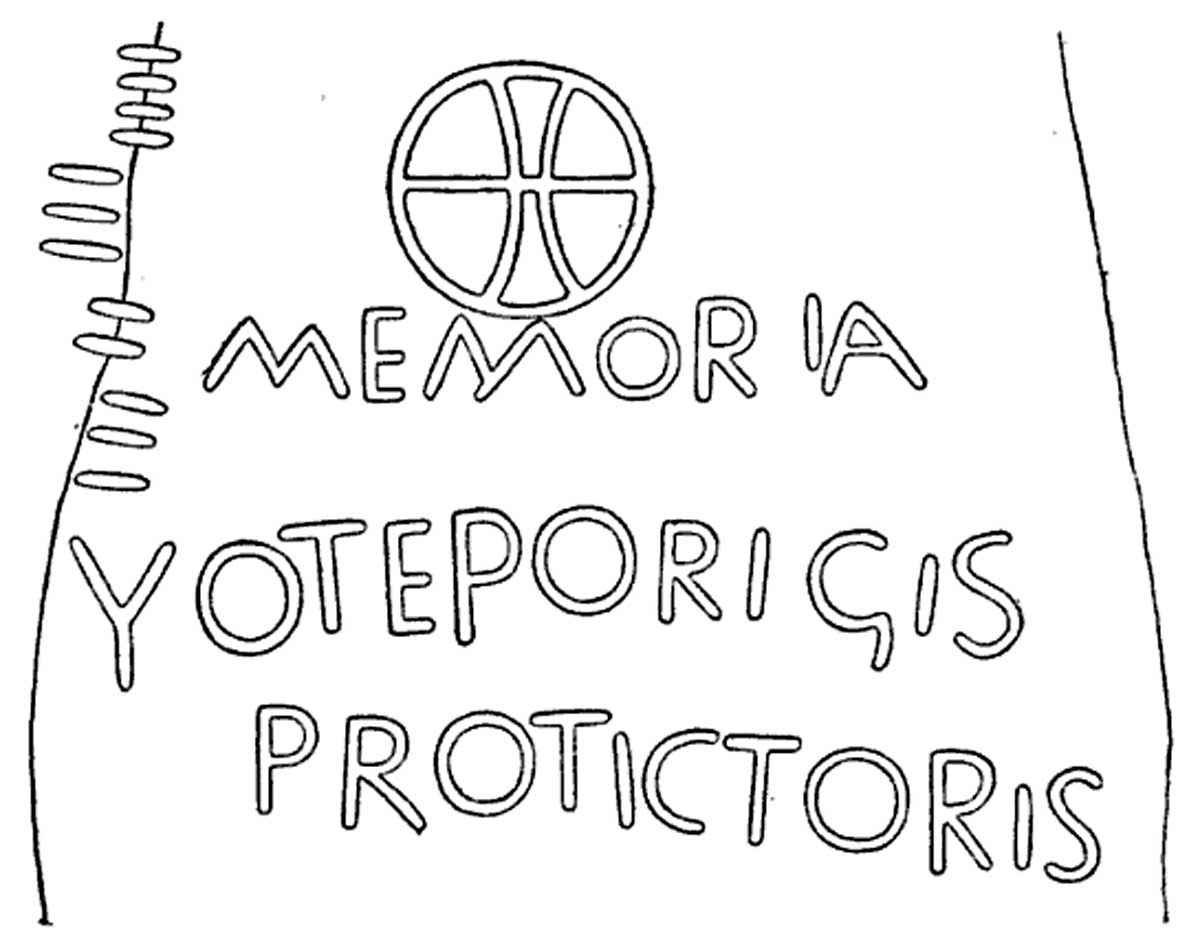
A 19th century sketch of a memorial stone to King Vortiporius of Dyfed, found at Castell Dwyran dating from circa.550 AD. The Latin inscription (centre) gives the late Imperial title of "protector", while the Ogham inscription (along the left edge) is evidence of Irish influence.

It was during this period that Dyfed saw much Irish settlement, and Triffyn is possibly named as Triphun in the Irish narrative, The Expulsion of the Déisi as a great-grandson of Eochaid Allmuir ("Eochaid the Foreigner"). The narrative describes how Eochaid traveled oversea with his descendants and settling in a place named Demed, before giving a line of his descendants down to Tudor map Regin (named as Tualodor mac Rígin). The Irish influence on the early kingdom lasted until the 5th century but is evidenced by the twenty Ogham stones found in the area. Some of the stones are bilingual and show a mix of Roman and Celtic heritage. The Ogham inscription on a stone at Castelldwyran, near Narberth dedicated to the 6th century king Vortiporius still gives him the late Imperial Roman title of "protector".

=== Church life ===
During the Age of the Saints, Dyfed may have had as many as seven bishops, called in Latin sacerdotes, one for each cantref; their sees were called parochia. However, by the High Middle Ages the Diocese of St Davids emerged as one of only three episcopal dioceses in Wales, with St Davids covering all of West Wales and part of Mid Wales.

=== Viking raids ===
Dyfed was subject to extensive raids during the Viking Age between the 8th and 11th centuries, causing social and political instability, and with the Vikings establishing settlements in southern Dyfed. By the latter part of the 9th century, the rulers of Dyfed had grown cautious of the influence of the sons of Rhodri the Great, and sought out an alliance and the patronage of Alfred the Great of England. Historical attempts have been made to cast the relationship as one as a confederation of Christian unity on the isle of Britain, under the leadership of Alfred, against the heathen Danes. However, there evolved a significant degree of coercion in the relationship, according to Davies. "The recognition by Welsh rulers that the king of England had claims upon them would be a central fact in the subsequent political history of Wales," according to Davies.

In about 904, Dyfed's ruler, Llywarch ap Hyfaidd, died, leaving his daughter Elen ferch Llywarch (893–943) as his heiress. Elen was married to Hywel Dda, ruler of neighbouring Seisyllwg and grandson of Rhodri the Great through his second son, Cadell ap Rhodri. Through his marriage to Elen, Hywel incorporated Dyfed into an enlarged realm to be known as Deheubarth, meaning the "south part", and later went on to conquer Powys and Gwynedd. However, both Powys and Gwynedd returned to their native dynasties on Hywel's death in 950. Hwyel's grandson Maredudd ab Owain recreated the kingdom of his grandfather, but his rule was beset with increasing Viking raids during the latter part of the 10th century. It is during this period that Viking settlements increased, particularly in the area in the cantref of Penfro, with other Viking settlements and trading station at Haverfordwest, Fishguard and Caldey Island in Dyfed. Viking raids upon the Welsh were "relentless", according to Davies, and Maredudd was compelled to raise taxes to pay the ransoms for Welsh hostages in 993, and in 999 a Viking raiding party attacked St Davids and killed Morganau, the bishop.

=== Norman invasion ===
Dyfed remained an integral province within Deheubarth until the Norman invasions of Wales between 1068 and 1100. In the Dyfed region, the cantrefi of Penfro, Rhos, Cemais and Pebidiog became occupied by Norman overlords. The Normans influenced the election of the Bishops of St Davids, in Pebidiog, from 1115 onwards. The Princes of Deheubarth, and later Llywelyn the Great as the Prince of a virtual Principality of Wales from 1216, fought to recover the region until the Conquest of Wales by Edward I in 1284 settled the matter. The 1284 Statute of Rhuddlan established the English counties of Pembrokeshire and Carmarthenshire out of the region formally known as Dyfed.

By 1138, Dyfed was incorporated into a new shire called Pembrokeshire after the Norman castle built in the Cantref of Penfro and under the rule of the Marcher Earl of Pembroke.

== See also ==
- Déisi
- Dyfed Archaeological Trust
- Pwyll Pendefig Dyfed

== Bibliography ==
- Charles-Edwards, Thomas (2013). Wales and the Britons, 350-1064. Oxford University Press. ISBN 978-0-19-821731-2.
