= Aurelius Conanus =

Brittonic king in 6th-century Britain

Aurelius Conanus or Aurelius Caninus was a Brittonic king in 6th-century sub-Roman Britain. The only certain historical record of him is in the writings of his contemporary Gildas, who excoriates him as a tyrant. He is also mentioned in William Winne's, The History of Wales (1697) p.7 as one of a succession of kings that fought against the Saxons. However, he may be identified with one of the several similarly named figures active in Britain during this period. In the 12th century Geoffrey of Monmouth adapted Gildas' account for his chronicle Historia Regum Britanniae, and thereafter Aurelius Conanus was remembered as a legendary King of Britain.

== Accounts ==
Gildas discusses Aurelius Conanus in Chapter 30 of his work De Excidio et Conquestu Britanniae, in a section in which he reproves five kings for their various sins. All the kings are compared to Biblical beasts; Aurelius is called the "lion's whelp". Gildas castigates him for his "horrible murders, fornications, and adulteries", and beseeches him to repent his sins before he ends up like the rest of his family, who have already died pursuing similar ends.

Little else can be said of Aurelius Conanus with any certainty; it is not even known in which part of Britain he ruled. Historian John Edward Lloyd suggests that the form Caninus, appearing in one important manuscript of De Excidio, may have been a corruption of the more common Cuna(g)nus, or Cynan in Welsh. As such he may be identified with one of the figures of that era who bore that name, such as Cynan Garwyn of Powys or his relative Cynin ap Millo. Lloyd suggests a connection with the degenerate descendants of the great hero Ambrosius Aurelianus whom Gildas mentions in Chapter 25. In this case his kingdom may have been located out in the territory later taken by the Anglo-Saxons, i.e. what is now England.

In the 12th century, Geoffrey of Monmouth adapted Gildas' account for his influential pseudohistory Historia Regum Britanniae, adding fictional details and making these contemporary regional rulers successive high-kings of Britain. Geoffrey makes Aurelius Conanus the nephew to the previous king Constantine, whom he kills after a reign of only three years. The kingship should go to another, unnamed uncle of Aurelius', but Aurelius pursues a civil war, ultimately imprisoning his kinsman and killing his sons. However, Aurelius only rules for two years before he himself dies; he is succeeded by Vortiporius.

Layamon's Brut by Layamon adds the detail that he poisoned his cousins, ill-treated his sisters and died by falling from a horse. The oldest version of the Prose Brut names "King Conaan" as the grandfather of Merlin, with Merlin's mother being named Adhan.

== Notes ==
Legendary titles
Preceded by Constantine III	King of Britain	Succeeded by Vortiporius
