= Vortiporius =

6th-century King of Dyfed

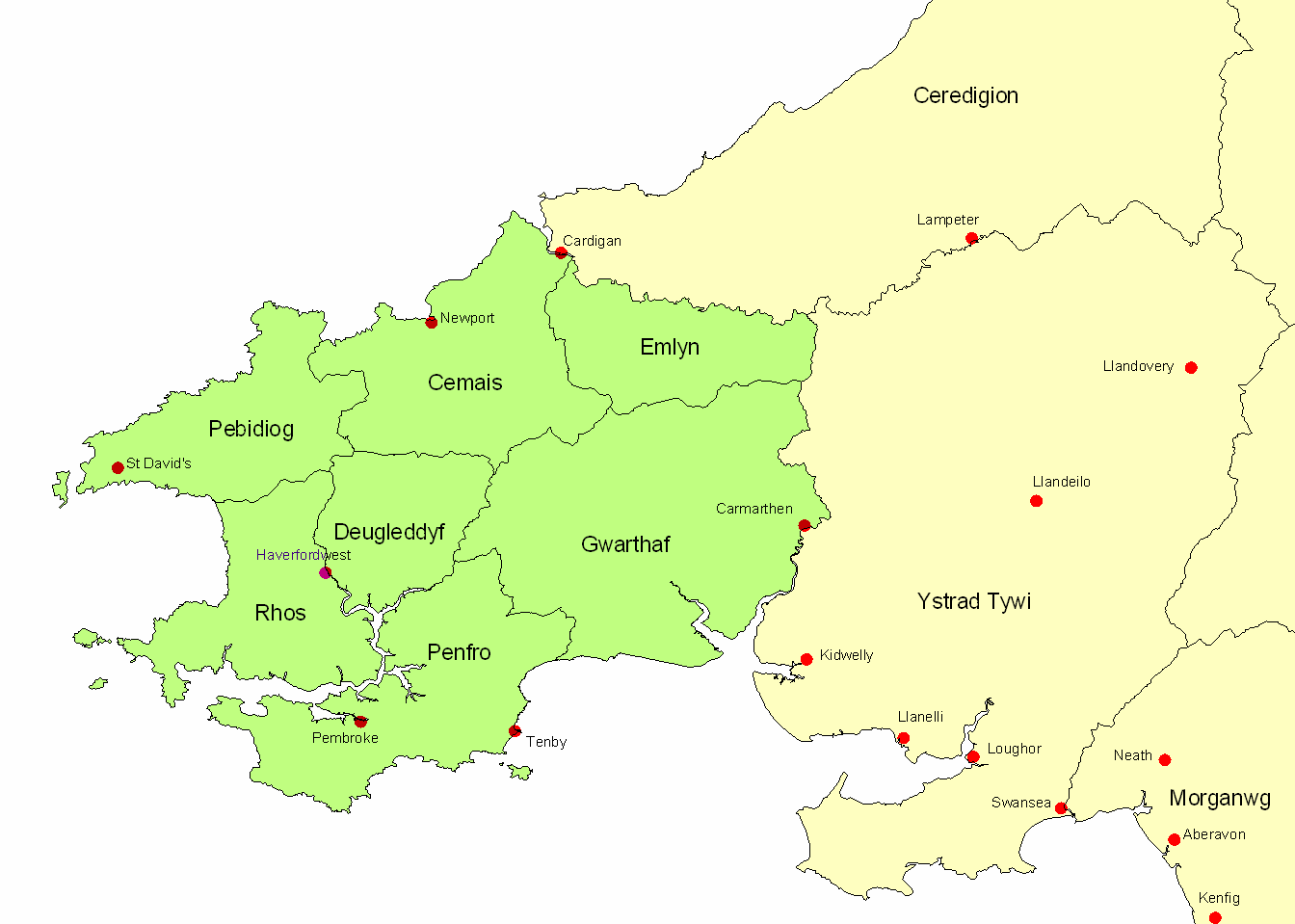
Map showing Dyfed, after the late 7th century, showing its seven cantrefi.

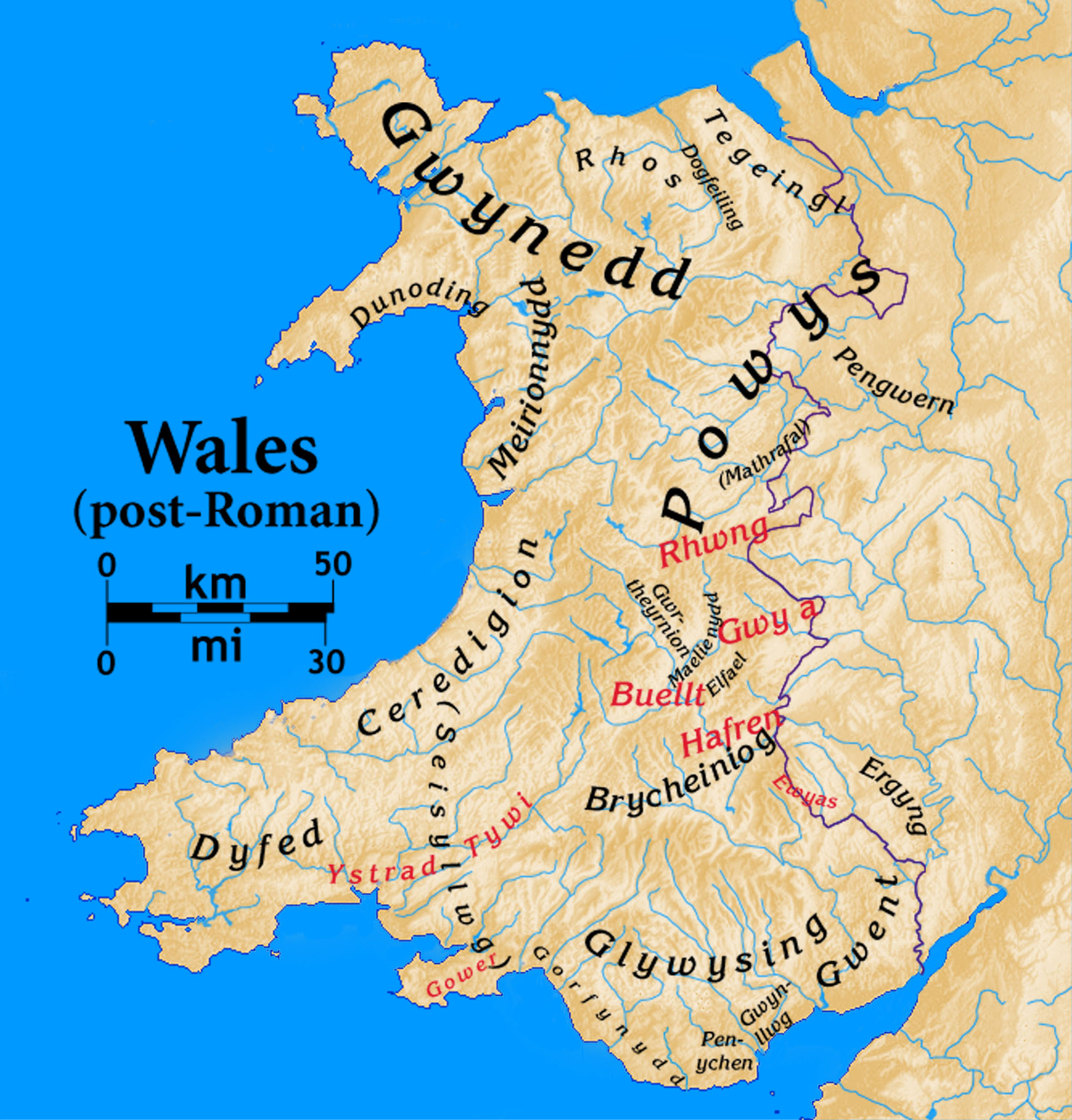
Map showing the location of Dyfed in southwesternmost Wales.

Vortiporius, often shortened to Vortipor (Old Welsh: Guortepir, Middle Welsh: Gwrdeber or Gwerthefyr), was a king of Dyfed in the early to mid-6th century. He ruled over an area approximately corresponding to modern Pembrokeshire, and Carmarthenshire, Wales. Records from this era are scant, and virtually nothing is known of him or his kingdom. The only contemporary information about Vortiporius comes from the Welsh ecclesiastic Gildas, in a highly allegorical condemnation from his De Excidio et Conquestu Britanniae (English: "On the Ruin and Conquest of Britain"). At the time the work was written (c. 540), Gildas says that Vortiporius was king of Dyfed, that he was grey with age, that his wife had died, and that he had at least one daughter.

As a legendary king in Geoffrey of Monmouth's 12th-century treatment of the Matter of Britain, the Historia Regum Britanniae, Vortiporius was the successor of Aurelius Conanus and was succeeded by Maelgwn Gwynedd. He is not mentioned in the 9th-century Historia Brittonum attributed to Nennius. Vortiporius appears in the Irish genealogy given in the 8th-century work The Expulsion of the Déisi, in which his name is given as Gartbuir. The pedigree given in the Harley MS 5389, written c. 1100, is nearly identical, with his name given as Guortepir. In the Jesus College MS. 20, he is called Gwrdeber. The genealogy in Expulsion says he was a descendant of Eochaid Allmuir (English: "Eochaid the Foreigner" [literally (from) Overseas]), who is said to have led a sept of the Déisi in their settlement of Dyfed c. 270.

A memorial stone was discovered in 1895 near the church of Castell Dwyran in Carmarthenshire bearing a Christian cross and with inscriptions in both Latin and in ogham. Dedicated to Voteporigis in the Latin inscription and Votecorigas in ogham, it was immediately assumed by Rhys that Vortiporius is Voteporix were the same person. He said that the 'r' had been added at a later date, and offered several suppositions as to how this might have happened. that this referred to Vortiporius. However, this assumption is refuted by modern linguistic analysis by Patrick Sims-Williams, which notes that the missing 'r' in the first syllable of 'Voteporigis'/'Votecorigas' or Voteporix in nominative is significant, and so the stone must be dedicated to a different person. He also adds that dating the stone to the time of Vortiporius may not be valid.

== Gildas ==
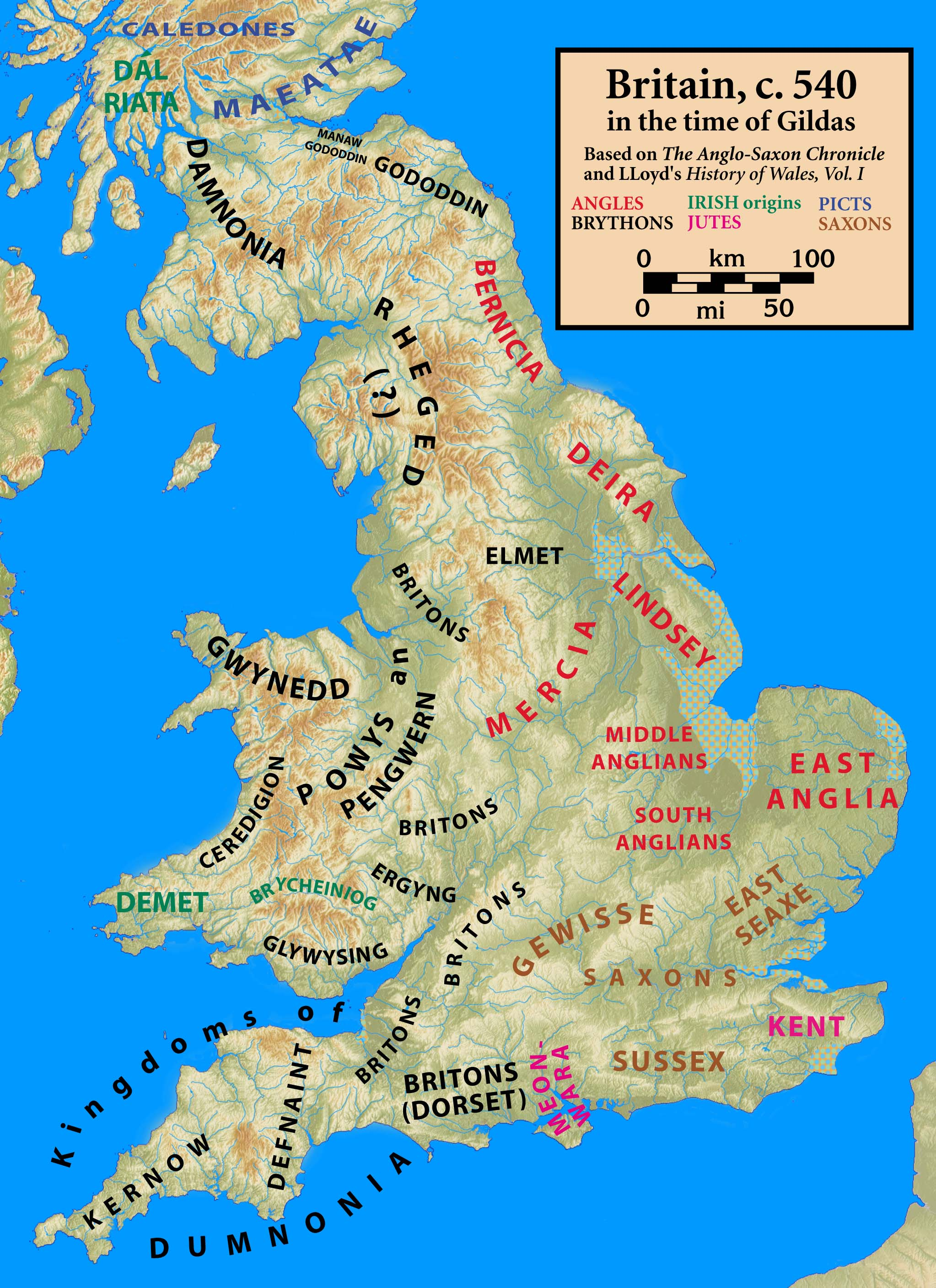

In his De Excidio et Conquestu Britanniae (English: On the Ruin and Conquest of Britain), written c. 540, Gildas makes an allegorical condemnation of 5 British kings by likening them to the beasts of the Christian Apocalypse as expressed in the biblical Book of Revelation, 13:2: the lion, leopard, bear, and dragon. In the course of his condemnations, Gildas makes passing reference to the other beasts mentioned in the Apocalypse, such as the eagle, serpent, calf, and wolf. Vortiporius is called "the spotted leopard" and the "tyrant of the Demetians", where Demetia is the ancient name of Dyfed.

Gildas restricts his attention to the kings of Gwynedd (Maelgwn Gwynedd), Dyfed (Vortiporius), Rhos (Cuneglasus may be the Cynlas appears in royal genealogies associated with the region), Dumnonia (Constantine), and the unknown region associated with Aurélius Caninus (probably Caer Gleuon, which nowadays Gloucester).

The reason for Gildas' disaffection for these individuals is unknown. He was selective in his choice of kings, as he had no comments concerning the kings of the other British kingdoms that were thriving at the time, such as Rheged, Gododdin, Elmet, Powys, or the kingdoms of modern-day southern England. Gildas claims outrage over moral depravity, and begins the condemnation of the five kings with an attack against the mother of one of the kings, calling her an "unclean lioness".

Of Vortiporius Gildas says little other than offering condemnation for "sins" and providing the few personal details previously mentioned. He is alleged to be the bad son of a good father. Gildas also attacks his daughter, calling her "shameless", and implies that Vortiporius raped or had a sexual relationship with her.

== Geoffrey of Monmouth ==
Geoffrey's mention of Vortiporius is contained in a brief chapter titled "Uortiporius, being declared king, conquers the Saxons". He says that Uortiporius succeeded Aurelius Conan, and after he was declared king, the Saxons rose against him and brought over their countrymen from Germany in a great fleet, but that these were defeated. Uortiporius then ruled peacefully for four years. Geoffrey's fertile imagination is the only source of this information.

The Myvyrian Archaiology of Wales, an early 19th-century collection of Welsh histories, repeats Geoffrey's account, referring to him as 'Gwrthevyr' (though Vortiporius' proper Modern Welsh spelling is Gwrdebyr; here the name has been confused with that of Vortimer, the son of Vortigern). In his Britannicarum Ecclesiarum Antiquitates, James Ussher also repeats the account, attributing the information to Geoffrey.

== Family ==
Vortipor ap Aergol Lawhir ap Triffyn Farfog was the father of a Cyngar and might also belong to the same family as the similarly named Voteporix comemorated on a monument bearing both Latin and Irish ogham inscriptions, dated to the 5th or 6th century, from Castell Dwyran, Carmarthenshire, Wales.

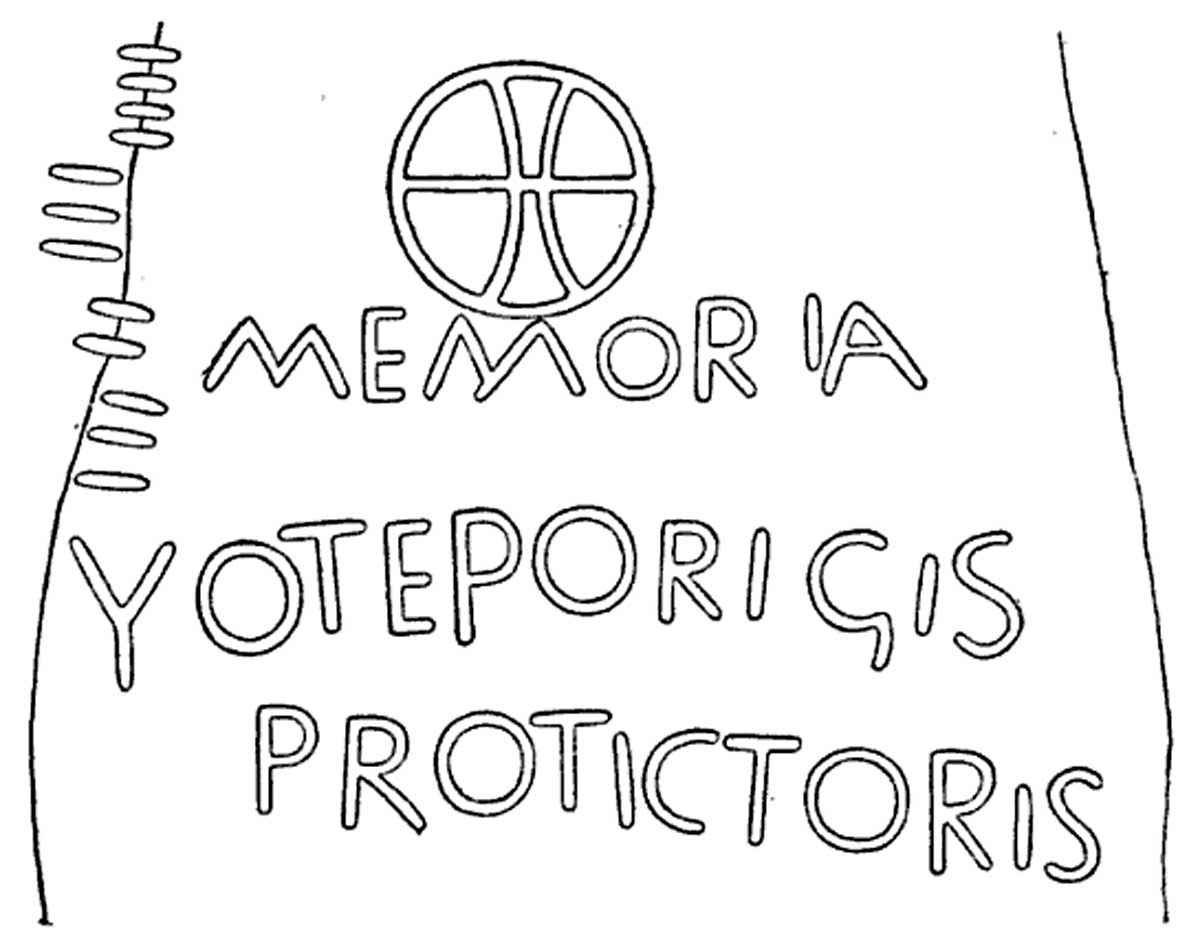
The Latin inscription on the 'Monument of Voteporigis the Protector', from a rubbing of the stone.

The stone's original location at the church is next to a meadow known locally as Parc yr Eglwys. Local tradition carries the admonition that plowing must not be done near the church. Examination of the meadow showed evidence of large hut-circles. The Latin inscription on the stone reads Memoria Voteporigis Protictoris

The ogham inscription carries only the Goidelic form of his name in the genitive: Votecorigas (early Goidelic did not possess the sound /p/). Protector (spelled here Protictoris, in the genitive) in the Latin inscription may imply a Roman-era honorific bestowed upon his ancestors, retained as a hereditary title into the 6th century. Eric Hamp suggests that Protector may be a Latin translation of Uoteporix (which has essentially the same meaning as the Latin), a "sort of explanatory gloss". The ogham inscription in Goidelic shows that Primitive Irish was still in use in this part of Britain at that time, and had not yet died out in South Wales.

== See also ==
- Vortimer, also known as Gwrthefyr in Welsh sources

== Citations ==
Regnal titles
Unknown	King of Dyfed early to mid 500s	Unknown
Legendary titles
Preceded by Aurelius Conanus	King of Britain	Succeeded by Malgo
