= Conjar =

Conjar is a surname. Notable people with the surname include:

- Larry Conjar (born 1945), American football player
- Monika Conjar (born 1995), Croatian footballer

== See also ==
- Congar
