= Keredic =

King of the Britons

Keredic (Welsh: Ceredig) was a legendary king of the Britons, as recounted by Geoffrey of Monmouth. The origin of Geoffrey's character is unknown, but he is not depicted as a Saxon. According to Geoffrey, Keredic's rule was so unpopular that the Saxons enlisted the aid of an army of Vandals from Ireland to drive him from his kingdom.

Geoffrey's legendary Keredic may have been a conflation of Cerdic, the traditional founder of Wessex, who, despite his political affiliation with the Saxons, was likely to be half-British himself, and another Cerdic, who reigned over the Celtic kingdom of Elmet around present-day Leeds until his defeat at the hands of Edwin of Northumbria. Whatever the case, Geoffrey places a lengthy interregnum between the expulsion of Keredic and the rise of the next British king, Cadfan ap Iago.

Keredic should not be confused with Ceredig, one of the sons of Cunedda and traditional founder of Ceredigion.

Legendary titles
| Preceded by Maelgwn Gwynedd | King of Britain | Vacant Interregnum Title next held by Cadfan ap Iago |
