= Triffyn Farfog =

King of Dyfed

- King of Dyfed
- Predecessor: Maelgwn ap Clotri
- Successor: Aergol Lawhir
- Born: c. 430

Triffyn Farfog (English: Triffyn the Bearded) was a semi-legendary fifth century king of Dyfed, father of Aergol Lawhir and grandfather of Vortipor. Peter Bartrum estimated his date of birth at around 430 AD.

== Biography ==
Triffyn's name is usually considered as derived from the Roman title tribunus, and in some texts his name is written much closer to the original Latin word. While Triffyn's parentage of Aergol is consistent in sources, his own descent is now unclear with multiple ancestries claimed in different genealogies. Early Irish genealogies name Triffyn's father as Aed Brosc, an invader of the dynasty of Eochaid Allmuir ("Eochaid the Foreigner"), remembered in his native land as a member of the Déisi. Welsh genealogies that do not mention Aed Brosc name Triffyn's father as Owain Fraisg. In addition some Welsh genealogies claim Triffyn was a descendant of the Roman usuper Magnus Maximus.

Triffyn is supposed to have married Gwledyr, daughter of Clydwyn ap Ednyfed, though this connection is described in tentative language by Bartrum.
