= Aergol Lawhir =

Semi-legendary Welsh king

- King of Dyfed
- Predecessor: Triffyn Farfog
- Successor: Vortiporius
- Born: c. 460
- Died: 527?

Aergol Lawhir (Aergol Longhand; fl. 460) was a semi-legendary king of Dyfed and son and heir of King Triffyn Farfog. His name is the Welsh form of the Latin Agricola, just as his father's name is the Cambrian form of "tribune".

His court was at Lis Castell (Lydstep) near Din Bych (Tenby); there may have been another at Castell Argoel (probably Caeth Argoel) in Dyfed, which was presumably named in his honour. He was a patron of the church at Llandaff and the bishops of Glywysing Saints Teilo and Euddogwy. He received Euddogwy's father King Budic II of Brittany after the latter was expelled from his land, and was remembered by Gildas as a "good king".

Aergol was known to be an enemy of King Cynan Garwyn of Powys and they clashed at Crug Dyfed. He possibly conquered the Ystrad Tywi around the late 400s which was why he was given the name "Long-Hand."
