= Congar =

Congar, or Çongar, is both a given name and surname. Notable people with the name include:

- Saint Congar of Congresbury (c. 470–520), Welsh abbot and bishop in Somerset, kingdom of Dumnonia
- Saint Cyngar of Llangefni (c. 488–c. 550), also rendered Congar of Llangefni, Patron Saint of Llangefni, Anglesey, in Wales
- Yasemin Çongar (born 1966), Turkish journalist, writer, and translator
- Yves Congar (1904–1995), French theologian and cardinal

== See also ==
- Conjar
