= Saint-Vincent Gate =

French city gate

- Porte Saint-Vincent
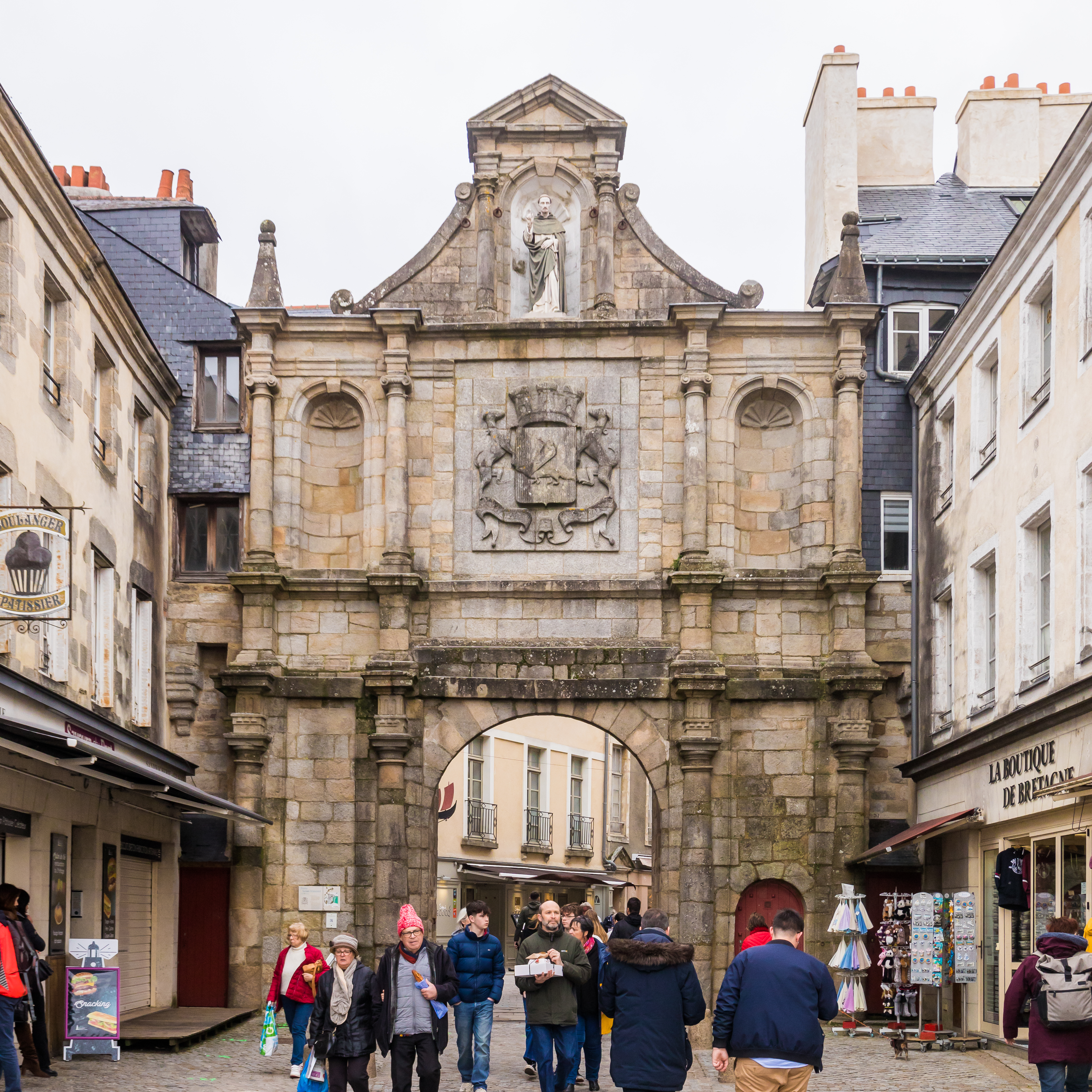
- Interactive map of Saint-Vincent Gate
- Location: Vannes
- Coordinates: 47.6545°N 2.7580°W
- Designer: Jean Bugeau
- Type: Baroque architecture
- Beginning date: 16th century
- Completion date: 17th century
- Monument historique: PA00091806

The Saint-Vincent Gate (Porte Saint-Vincent) is a former city gate in Vannes, Brittany, France. It is listed in the Base Mérimée as a historic monument.

== Gallery ==
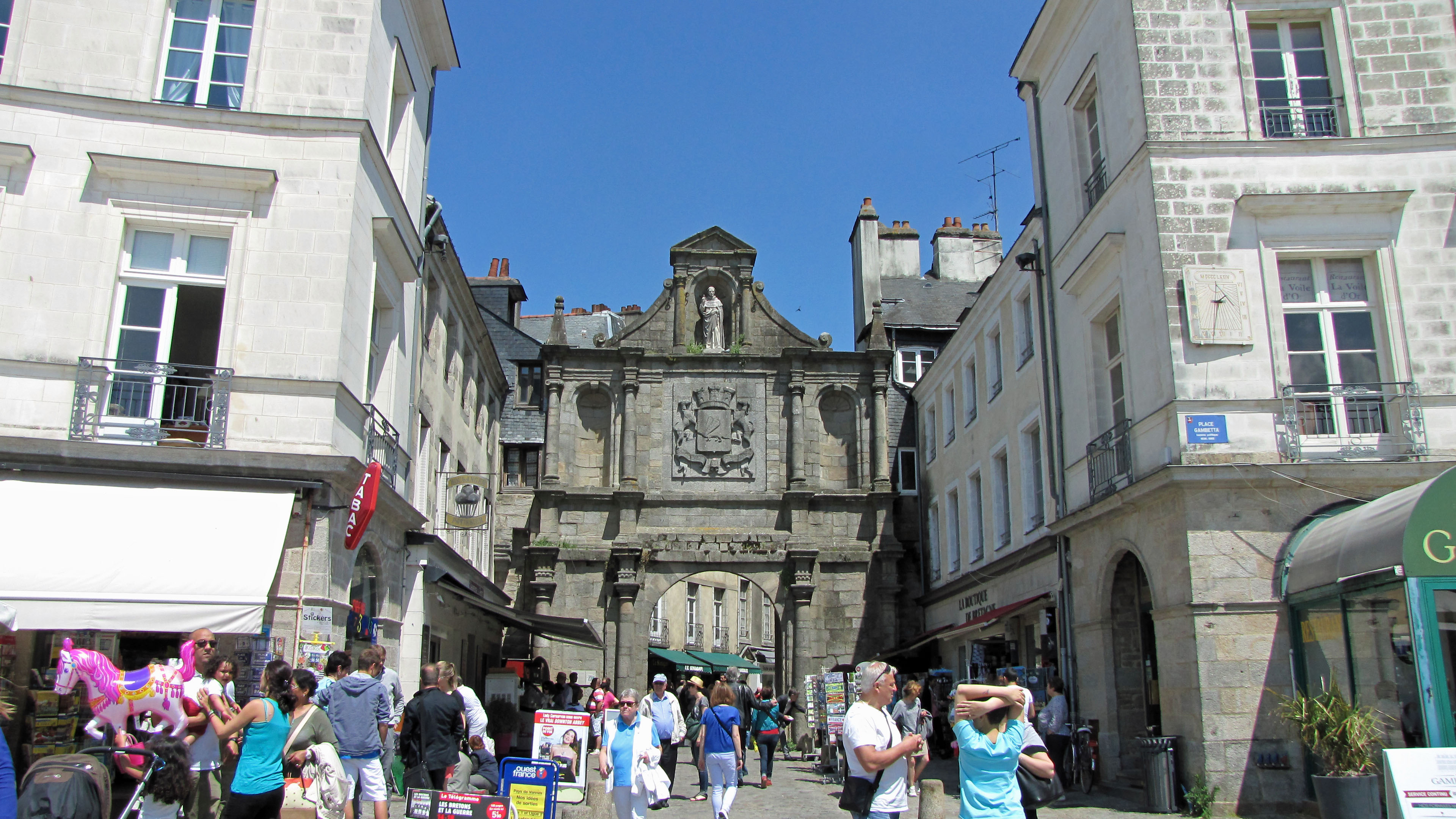

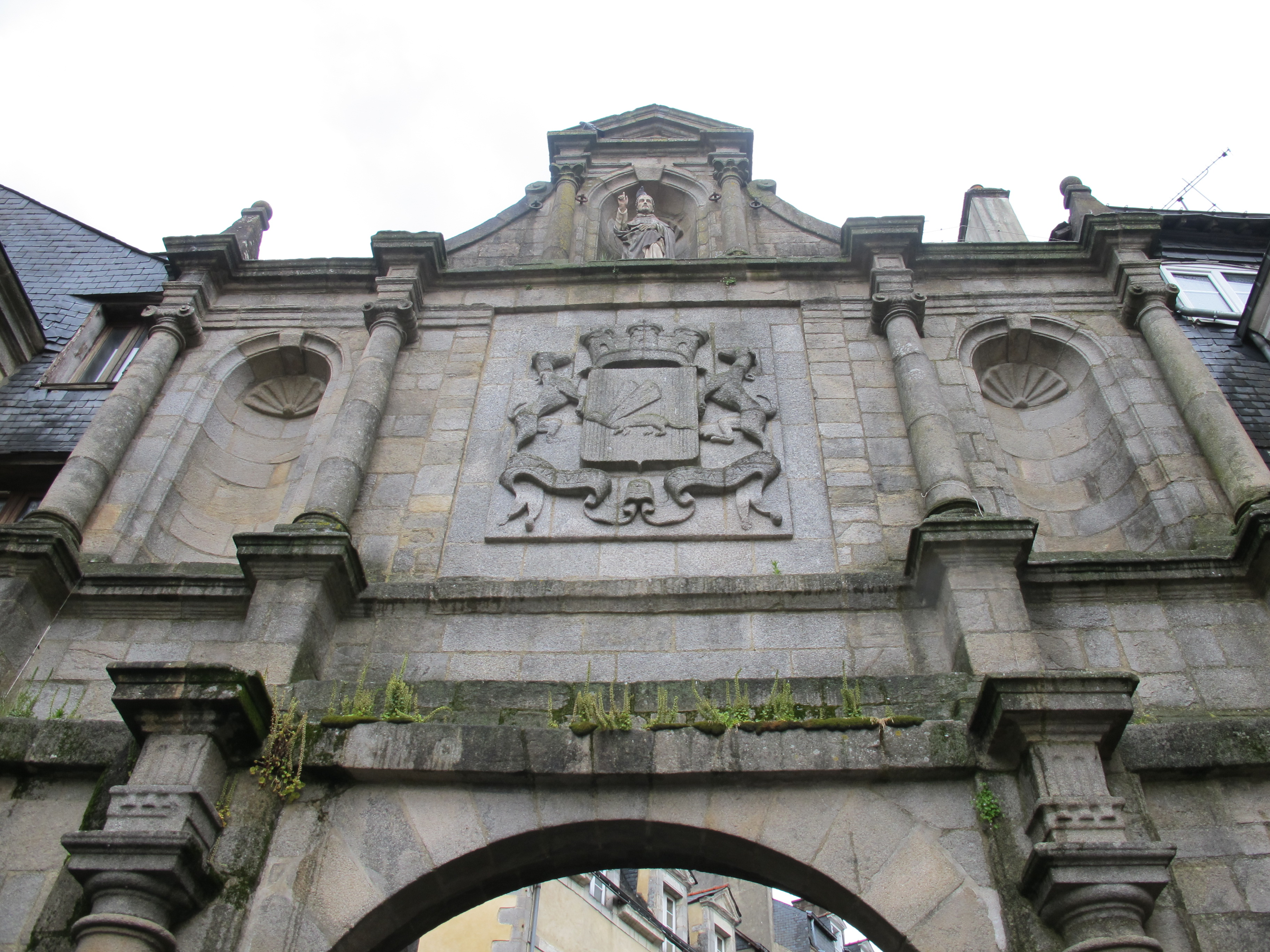

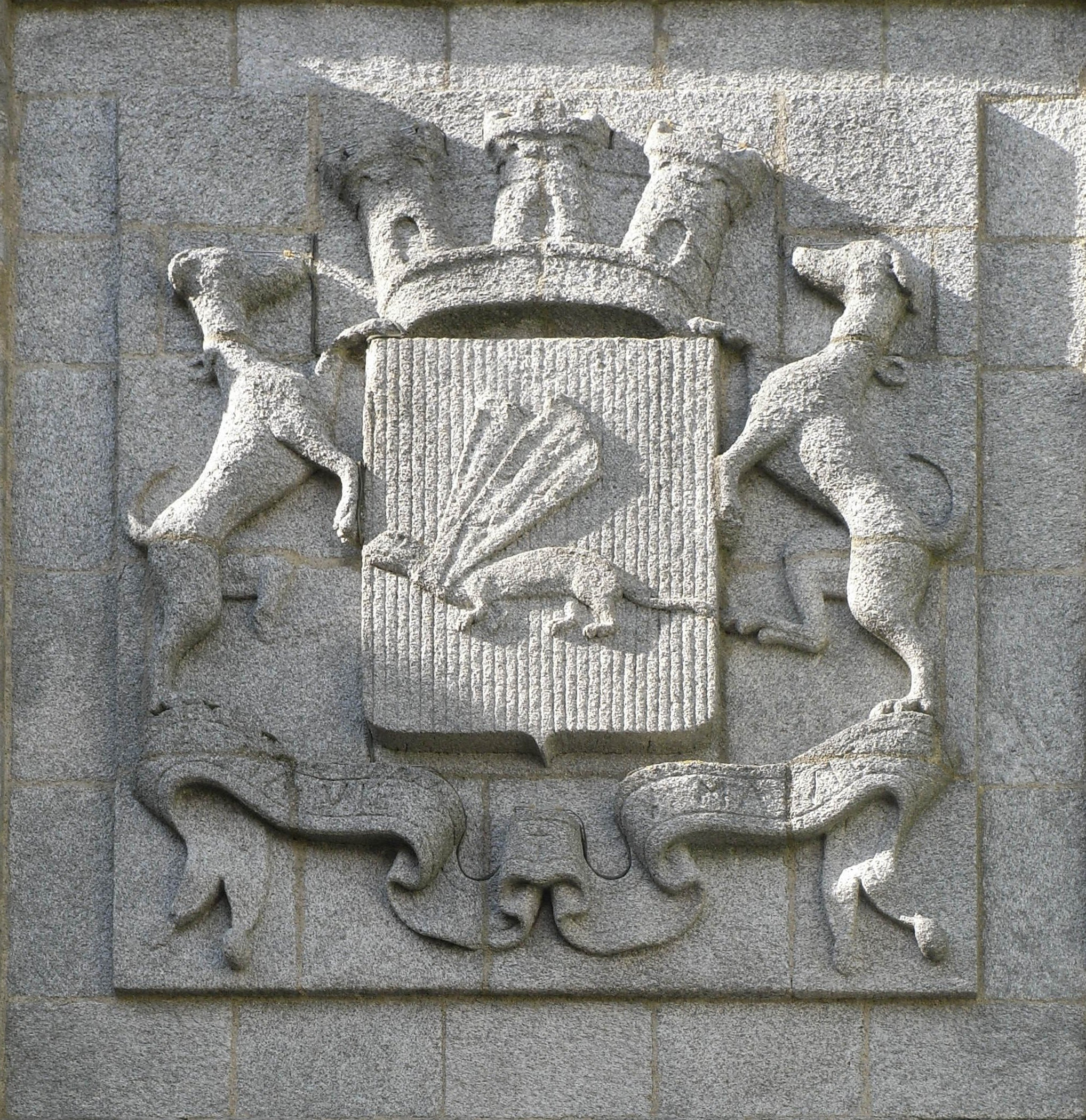

== Bibliography ==
- (in French) Olivier Furon, Collection Mémoire en Images, éditions Alain Sutton, Vannes, 1995.
