= Gwened (disambiguation) =

Gwened is the Breton-language name for the city of Vannes, in Brittany.

Gwened may also refer to:

- Bro Gwened, a historical realm and county within Brittany (named the Vannetais in French)
- Gwenedeg, the regional dialect of Breton in Bro Gwened

== See also ==
- Gwereg
- Morbihan, the approximate modern area of Bro Gwened in France
