= Poher =

Coordinates: 48.2758°N 3.5744°W

Modern flag of Poher.

Poher is an ancient principality that emerged in the Early Middle Ages in Cornouaille in west-central Brittany. Its capital was the Gallo-Roman city of Vorgium, capital of the Osismii, which became Carhaix after the fall of the Roman Empire. Archaeological excavations scheduled since 1999 show that, even if the city lost its function as capital after the 4th century, it was nonetheless a stronghold and major strategic crossroads.

== Origins ==
Poher's name derives from Pou Kaer, Pou being a derivative of Latin pagus ("region," as in a Gallo-Roman district) and kaer being Old Breton for "fortified city."

In the Middle Ages, Carhaix was only a subdivision of the parish of Plouguer (Plou-Kaer = "parish of the city/castle"), having just one church dedicated to St. Trémeur. Plouguer, whose church is dedicated to St. Peter – circumstantial evidence of seniority – is the seat of the original parish which takes its name from the once-fortified site it encompasses. Having become communes after the French Revolution, Carhaix and Plouguer merged in 1956 under the name of Carhaix-Plouguer.

== The uncertain and changing boundaries of Poher ==
Its boundaries have been very fluid over the course of history, its land area tending to decrease over time. Hubert Guillotel has it coinciding with the Bishopric of Cornouaille. André Chédeville goes even further, giving it a coastline on the English Channel: "It is likely that in the early centuries, this pagus was narrower in terms of longitude but extended further north, where, like other pagi, it had its coastline. When the diocesan boundaries were set in the Carolingian period, the pagus Castelli was cut into two parts, as ecclesiastical districts, expanded, one in the diocese of Quimper as we just mentioned, the other in that of Treguier."

In a pouillé (ecclesiastical register) of the 14th century, Poher remains as one of the two archdeaconates in the Bishopric of Cornouaille, the other archdeaconate also being called Cornouaille. It only included the deaneries of Cap Sizun, Cap-Caval (future Bigouden) and Fouesnant (from Gourin to Clohars-Fouesnant).

From then on, Poher is associated with the bulk of the bishopric, which leads Joëlle Quaghebeur to consider that the Carolingian name Poher succeeds the name of Cornouaille.

According to Viscount Frotier La Messelière, "occupying the high valleys of the Aulne and its tributaries, on the highest peaks of Lower Brittany, Poher extends, from east to west, about fifty kilometers, from the eastern borders of Glomel, Rostrenen, Kergrist-Moëlou and Maël-Pestivien in Côtes-du-Nord, to the western limits of Châteauneuf-du-Faou, [Plonévez-du-Faou], Loqueffret, Brennilis and Botmeur, in Finistère, and about thirty kilometers north to south, from the Monts d'Arrée to those of the Montagne Noir and the middle of the Aulne's course." This author excludes any commune of the Morbihan from Poher; however, the commune of Le Faouët is considered part of Poher.

More recently, Christiane Kerboul-Vilhon assigned fairly similar limits; for her, it corresponds to the Bassin de Châteaulin.

== History ==
=== Dark legend: Conomor, bloodthirsty prince of Poher? ===
Poher was the seat of a powerful dynasty of counts in the Carolingian era, whose traces are scattered in very rare archives and in the Lives of the saints of Brittany.

Conomor (Kon Meur = "big dog"), denoted as Prince of Poher, is steeped in a legend which makes him the Bluebeard of sixth-century Brittany. He would have killed numerous women, one after another, not sparing the last, Saint Tryphine, and her young child, Saint Trémeur (Trec'h Meur = "great winner"), whom he would have decapitated. Saint Gildas having miraculously replaced the child's head, the child would come to taunt his father by throwing him a handful of dirt. Struck by divine vengeance, Conomor would have perished instantly.

=== Historical evidence ===
Conomor's name is mentioned many times by Gregory of Tours as a Breton count who saved Macliauus from the vengeance of his brother, Chanao. He is also an enemy of the Franks who sided with Chram in his struggle against his brother King Chlothar II.

His also appears at different times on the other side of the Channel. The discovery at Castle Dore in Cornwall of an inscription which reads "Marcus Quonomorus Drustanus" has led some historians, including Christian Kerboul, to identify the king Mark of Cornwall, whose nephew is the legendary Tristan (Drustanus?), with the Conomor of legend. This hypothesis of a principality established astride the channel in the 6th century remains unverified.

In 871, while Salomon is still king of Brittany, Judicael is indicated as princeps Poucher without anyone knowing that a brand of such dignity was uncommon at the time.

A viscount of Poher, named Bernard, appears in the 11th century, and his lineage appears to have particular significance to the Sainte-Croix abbey of Quimperié, appearing to supplant the dynasty of Cornouaille which had assumed the ducal dignity since Hoel II in 1066.

=== List of Viscounts and Counts of Poher ===
- Alain de Poher
- Mathuedoi I (907-930) married a daughter of Alan I, Duke of Brittany, his son was Alan II, Duke of Brittany
- Alain le Renard
- Bernard (11th century)
