= Waroch =

Waroch may refer to:

- Waroch I (d. c. 550), Breton ruler of the Vannetais
- Waroch II (fl. 578–90), grandson, Breton ruler of the Vannetais
