= Chanao I =

Ruler of Vannetais (550-560 CE)

Chanao I or Canao was king of Vannetais in Brittany, France, in 550–560. Chanao was the son of king Waroch I and he claimed power over the whole south of Breton Armorica, using political assassination to achieve his ends.

== Biography ==
Chanao was the brother of Macliau, bishop of Vannes. He killed three of his brothers to ensure complete control of the throne. Macliau, the last survivor, was the prisoner of his brother, who wanted to kill him as well. Felix, bishop of Nantes, was able to release him on the condition that he swear allegiance. Chanao, learning that his brother wanted to break his oath, pursued him again. Macliau fled to Conomor, another regional count, who gave him protection. It is believed that Conomor was married to Macliau and Chanao's sister, Tryphine.

Canao and his ally Chram, a Frankish prince, took part in the first attack against the Frankish king Clotaire I on the Armorican Bretons (559); he and Chramme were killed during this battle.

After Chanao's death, Macliau took power over the region. Macliau's son was Waroch II.
