= Child murder =

Homicide of a minor

Child murder, also known as pedicide, child manslaughter or child homicide, is the homicide of an individual who is a minor. In many legal jurisdictions, it is considered an aggravated form of homicide. The age of the victim may constitute an aggravated factor for homicide offenses, or child murder may be a stand-alone criminal offense.

== Punishment by jurisdiction ==
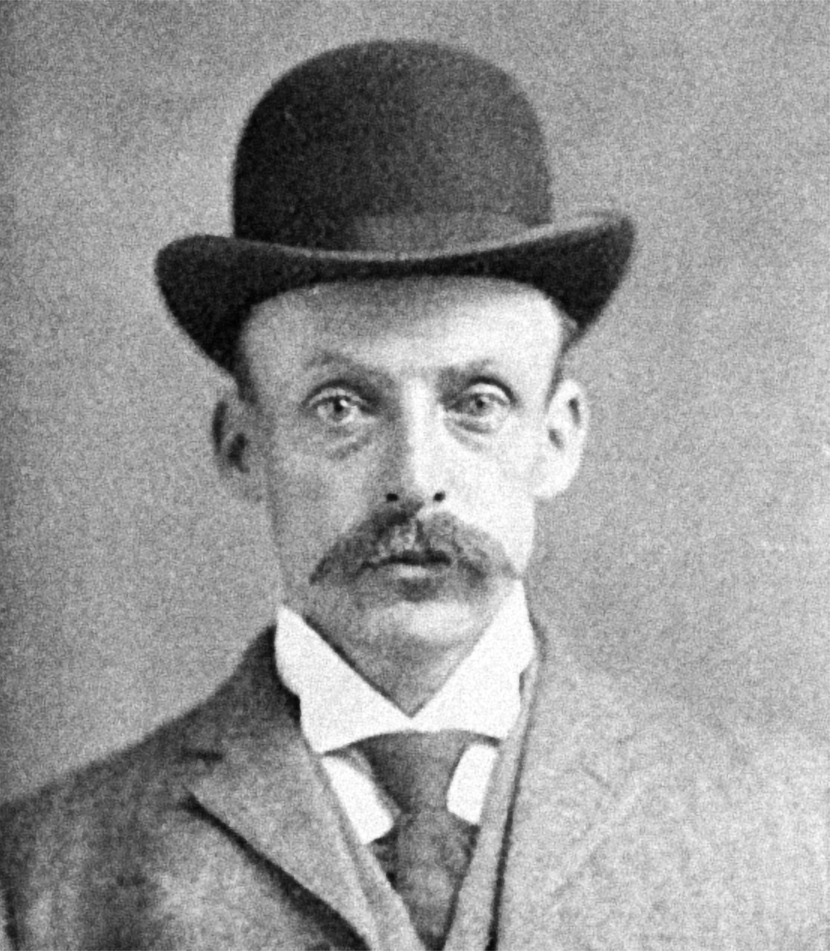
Albert Fish, a serial killer known for committing pedicides from the 1920s until his arrest in 1932

=== United States ===
In 2008, there were 1,494 pedicides in the United States. Among the victims, 1,035 were male and 452 were female.

About half of the states that maintain the death penalty have included pedicide to their list of aggravating factors that may make a murder punishable by death. The victim's age under which the crime is a capital crime varies between states. The ages are set between 10 and 17, with 12 being the most common age.

Child manslaughter can result in an aggravated charge in some jurisdictions such as in the State of Florida.

=== United Kingdom ===
Any murder in the United Kingdom carries a mandatory life sentence. In England and Wales, pedicides involving sexual or sadistic conduct or abduction of the victim can result in a whole life order (i.e. life imprisonment without the possibility of parole) being imposed where the offender is at least 21 years of age. Sentencing guidelines state that where the offender is under 21, the starting point is a minimum term of 30 years.

== By other children ==
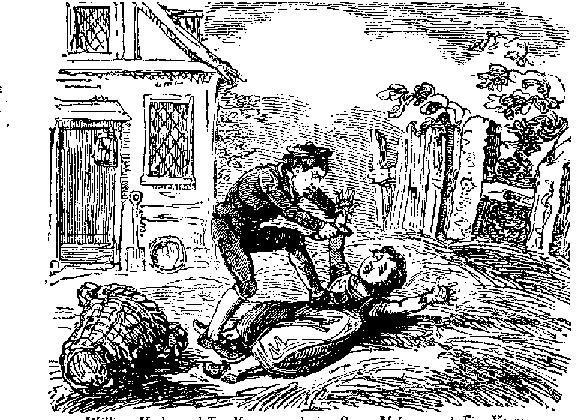
18th century illustration of William York (aged 10) murdering Susan Matthew (aged 5) on 13 May 1748, from The Newgate Calendar

In most countries, there are very few cases where children are killed by other children. According to the U.S. Department of Justice statistics for 1996, one in five pedicides were committed by other children. Several pedicides have gained prominent media exposure.

One was the killing on 12 February 1993 of the 2-year-old boy James Bulger by Robert Thompson and Jon Venables who were both 10 years old in Bootle, Merseyside, England. He was beaten and stoned before his corpse was left on train tracks in order to give the impression that a train had hit him. Bulger's killers became the youngest convicted murderers in the modern history of the United Kingdom.

Another notable case in the UK occurred in 1968 in Newcastle upon Tyne, when 10-year-old Mary Bell was convicted of manslaughter due to diminished responsibility in the deaths of toddlers Martin Brown and Brian Howe. She was released in 1980 at the age of 23.

In 1998, 8-year-old Madelyn Clifton was killed by 14-year-old Josh Phillips.

One of the most recent cases occurred in May 2021 in St. Johns County, Florida, when 14-year-old Aiden Fucci fatally stabbed his schoolmate, 13-year-old Tristyn Bailey. Bailey sustained 114 stab wounds in total. In 2023, Fucci pleaded guilty to the murder and was sentenced to life in prison.

== By medical professionals ==
Children, especially infants, have been killed on purpose by medical professionals. Katherine Ramsland, an expert in serial killers, believes predatory offenders may view healthcare agencies as "places of trust" where they have advantages. While other killers may decide to reduce the workload, or set someone up out of spite, or get God complex and think they are helping their victims, or be seeking attention, self-empowerment, and thrill. In one such case, neonatal nurse Lucy Letby was accused of killing at least 7 infants between June 2015 and 2016 at the Countess of Chester Hospital and attempting to kill a further 10 more. In another case, French anaesthetist Frédéric Péchier was sentenced for murdering or attempting to murder patients as young as 4 years old, from 2008 to 2017, out of jealousy and disdain for his peers.

== Media coverage ==
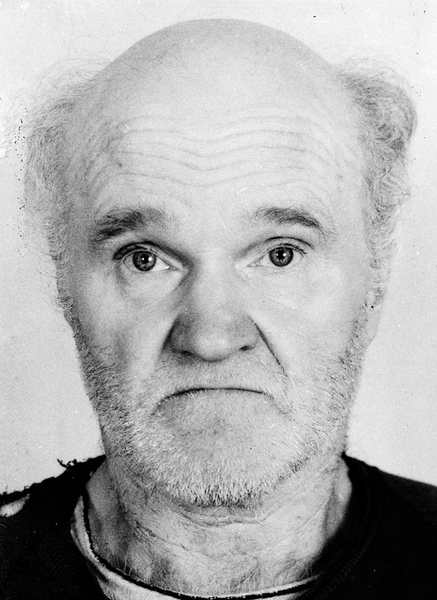
Jammu Siltavuori, also known as "Uncle Jammu", murdered two 8-year-old girls in 1989.

In 1992, after the fatal shooting of 7-year-old Dantrell Davis as he left the Cabrini–Green public housing project for school, the Chicago Tribune put every pedicide on the front page. 62 pedicides were reported that year.

Multiple deaths in one incident, such as the 1999 Columbine High School massacre, 2012 Sandy Hook Elementary School shooting, 2022 Robb Elementary School shooting, 2018 Parkland high school shooting and the 1996 Dunblane massacre tend to gather the most media attention but are statistically scarce.

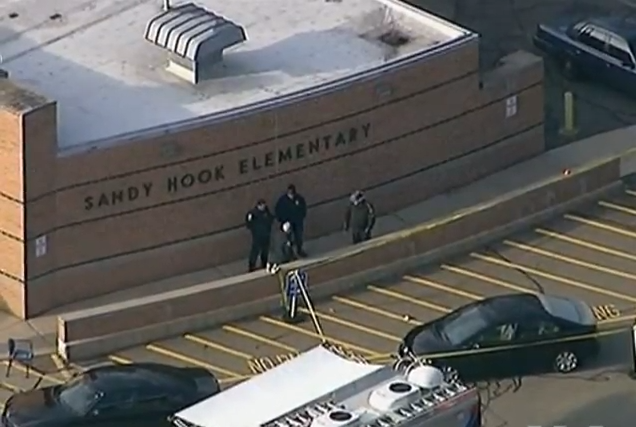
A photo of the police at the Sandy Hook Elementary School shortly after the Sandy Hook Elementary School shooting ended

== Genocide and child soldiers ==
The military use of children refers to children being placed in harm's way in military actions, in order to protect a location or provide propaganda. This is sometimes referred to as child sacrifice, though not equivalent to the religious variety. It may also refer to the use of children as child soldiers or saboteurs.

Red Hand Day on February 12 is an annual commemoration day to draw public attention to the practice of using children as soldiers in wars and armed conflicts.

== Muti killings ==
Medicine murder, often referred to as muti killing, is a practice of human sacrifice and mutilation associated with traditional medicinal practices, such as muti. Victims of muti killings are often children. Organs and/or body parts are usually taken while the child is still alive. An unknown child (referred to as Adam), whose decapitated torso was found in the River Thames in London in 2002 is believed to have been the victim of a muti killing.

== Murdered children of royalty ==
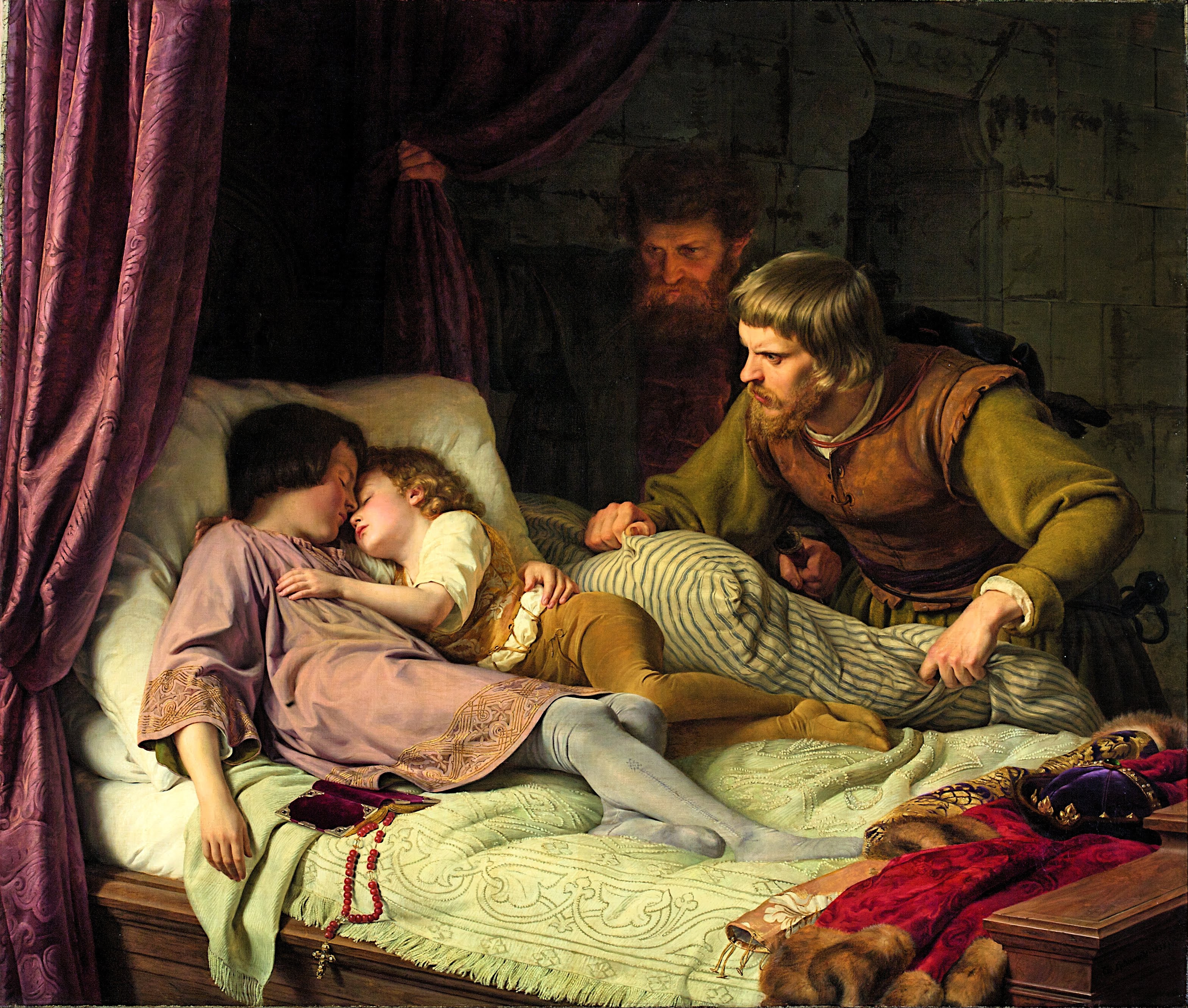
A painting from 1835 by Theodor Hildebrandt with the title The Murder of the Sons of Edward IV depicting Edward V of England and his brother Richard of York about to be killed

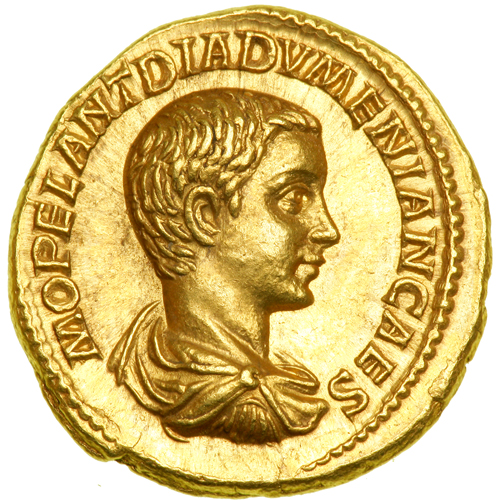
Diadumenian, killed at the age of nine

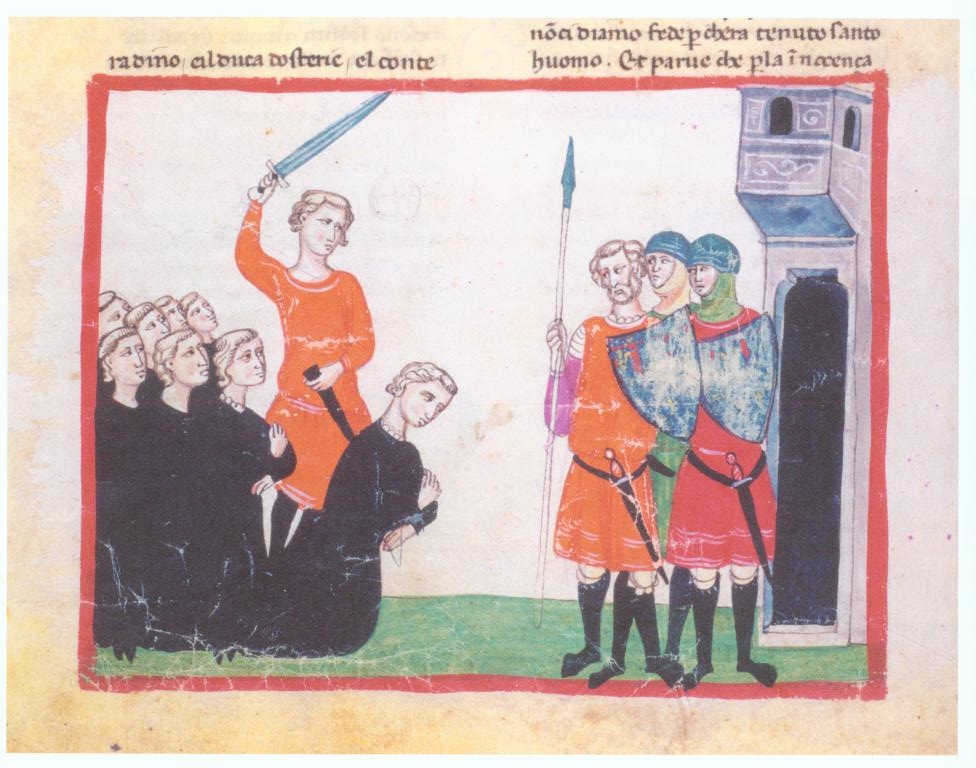
Aged 16, Conradin was beheaded.

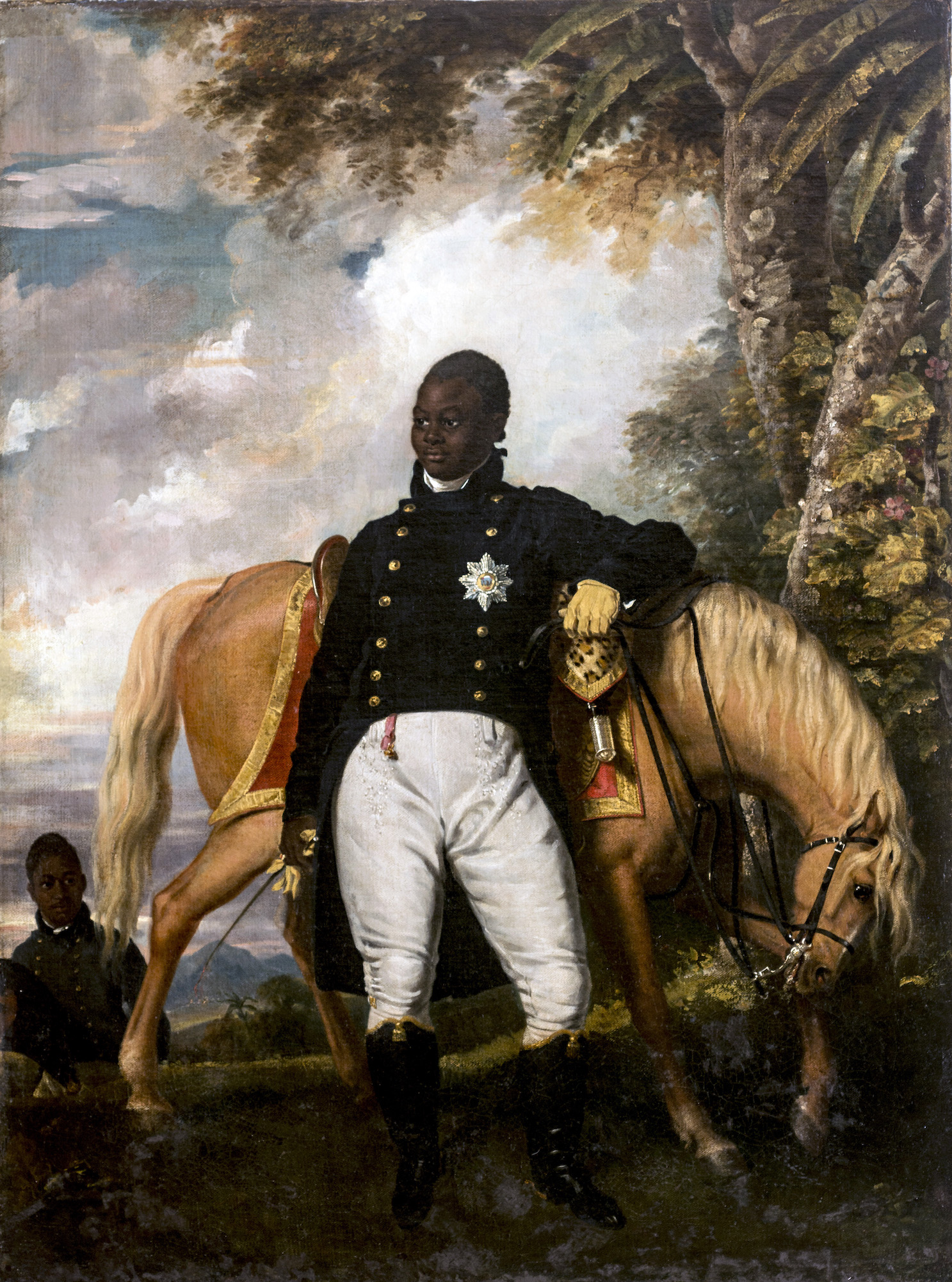
Jacques-Victor Henry, Prince Royal of Haiti, bayoneted by revolutionaries at the age of 16

- Alexander IV of Macedon, 323–309 BC
- Two sons of Queen Dowager Zhao of Qin and her lover Lao Ai, † 238 BC
- Hieronymus of Syracuse, 231–214 BC
- Ptolemy XIV Philopator, pharaoh of Egypt, c. 59–44 BC (possibly poisoned but it remains uncertain)
- Caesarion, June 23, 47 BC – August 23, 30 BC
- Julia Drusilla, summer of AD 39 – 24 January 41
- Diadumenian, Roman co-emperor (May–June 218), September 14, 208 – June 218
- Licinius II, Roman co-emperor (317-324), c. 315 – c. 326
- Gisald (son of Sigismund of Burgundy), † 1 May 524
- Gondebaud (son of Sigismund of Burgundy), † 1 May 524
- Théodebald (son of Chlodomer), c. 521-531
- Gunthaire (son of Chlodomer), c. 523-531
- Tremorus of Brittany (son or stepson of Conomor) - Legendary (6th century AD)
- Tiberius (son of East-Roman emperor Maurice), † 27 November 602
- Petrus (son of East-Roman emperor Maurice), † 27 November 602
- Paulus (son of East-Roman emperor Maurice), † 27 November 602
- Justin (son of East-Roman emperor Maurice), † 27 November 602
- Justinian (son of East-Roman emperor Maurice), † 27 November 602
- Merovech (son of Theudebert II of Austrasia), † 612
- Chilperic, king of Aquitaine, † 632
- Tiberius, Byzantine co-emperor (706-711), 705 – December 711
- Edward the Martyr, c. 962 – 18 March 978
- Several sons of Harald Kesja, some of which might have been minor, were murdered in 1135
- Harald (son of Sigurd Munn & Kristin Sigurdsdatter), killed in the 1160s before the age of majority
- Alexios II Komnenos, 14 September 1169 – September 1183
- Emperor Antoku of Japan, December 22, 1178 – April 25, 1185
- Vira Bahu I, King of Polonnaruwa, 1179 – 1196
- Conradin, Duke of Swabia & King of Jerusalem, 25 March 1252 – 29 October 1268
- Şehzade Halil, probably 1346 – 1362
- Thong Lan, king of Ayutthaya, c. 1373/74 – c. 1388/89
- Chang of Goryeo, September 6, 1381 – December 31, 1389
- Yi Bang-Beon (son of Taejo of Joseon & Queen Sindeok), 1381 – October 6, 1398
- Yi Bang-Seok (son of Taejo of Joseon & Queen Sindeok), 1382 – October 6, 1398
- Danjong of Joseon, August 9, 1441 – December 24, 1457
- Alexios V, Trapezuntine emperor, 1454 – November 1, 1463
- Edward V of England, November 2, 1470 – c. 1483
- Richard of Shrewsbury, Duke of York, August 17, 1473 – c. 1483
- Lê Quang Trị, Emperor of Annam, 1509 – May 1516 (his two brothers were killed along with Quang Trị)
- Feodor Godunov, 1589 – 10 or 20 June 1605
- Osman the Young of the Ottoman Empire, November 3, 1604 – May 20, 1622
- Louis XVII of France, March 27, 1785 – June 8, 1795
- Jacques-Victor Henry, Prince Royal of Haiti, March 3, 1804 – October 18, 1820
- Grand Duchess Anastasia Nikolaevna of Russia, June 18, 1901 – July 17, 1918
- Tsarevich Alexei Nikolaevich of Russia, August 12, 1904 – July 17, 1918
