= Bro Gwened =

Historic realm and county of Brittany, France

A French-language map of the traditional regions of Brittany in Ancient Régime France. Bro Gwened is marked in shades of purple.

The flag of the former realm.

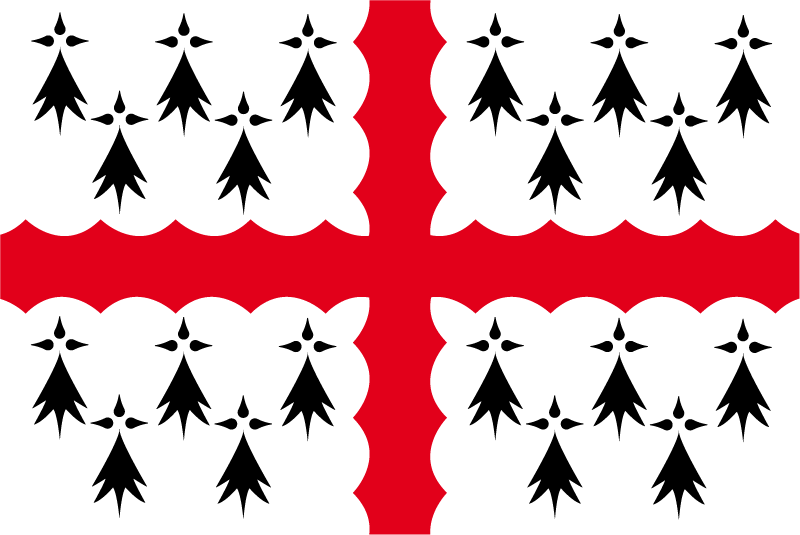
The flag of the former county.

Gwened, Bro-Gwened (Breton: Bro-Wened) or Vannetais (French: Pays Vannetais) is a historic realm and county of Brittany in France. It is considered part of Lower Brittany.

Bro-Gwened was an early medieval principality or kingdom around Vannes in Armorica (Brittany), lasting from around AD 490 to around 635. It was peopled by Christianized Britons fleeing the Saxon invasions of Britain, who displaced or assimilated the remaining pagan Veneti Gauls. Its bishop and (usually) court was at Gwened, the site of the former Roman settlement of Darioritum and the present French city of Vannes.

The territories are included within the modern French department of Morbihan.

== Name ==
The Breton placename-element plou (Latin: plebs) initially meant a tribe, but came to signify its territory as well. The standard Breton form of the name mutates Gwened, the Breton name for Vannes, while the local dialect leaves it unchanged as "Bro-Gwened". The modern French name derives from adjectival form of Vannes. Both Gwened (Note: Via the Old Breton forms Giünet and Günett to later Guened and finally Gwened.) and Vannes reflect separate developments of the Latin Veneti, the Romans' name for the Gaulish tribe in the area. (It is unrelated to the Welsh realm and county of Gwynedd, which developed from Latin Venedotia.)

The historic realm was also known as Bro Erec (Breton: Bro-Ereg, "land of Gwereg") or Bro Waroch (from the gallicisation of the same name) or by numerous variant spellings, (Note: Including Bro-Uueroc.) although it is unclear whether the namesake Gwereg was Waroch I or II.

== History ==
The land was allegedly founded by Caradog Strongarm. In the early 6th century, Macliau served as one of the earliest bishops of Vannes prior to usurping his nephew's inheritance in neighboring Cornouaille. He may have also been king of Broerec or simply the refugee guest of Conmor. Major settlements at this time included Gwened (Vannes) and Lokmaria (Locmaria). In the mid-7th century, Bro Gwened was united with Domnonia under its king Saint Judicaël, who was descended from a daughter of Budic II. Domnonia's rulers thenceforth reigned as the high kings of Brittany, with Bro Gwened forming part of their lands.

== Dialect ==
A map of the dialects of Brittany

The dialect of Gwened's present inhabitants is known in Breton as Gwenedeg and in French as Vannetais. It is distinct from that of the other regions of Brittany to the point of near unintelligibility. A primary distinction is that the Gwened dialect has paralleled Gaelic in developing earlier θ into h rather than z; ð, meanwhile, has disappeared completely rather than merge with z as in Leon although there are certain parts of Gwened (e.g. the city Baud) where it is still used as an initial mutation of d and t and sometimes in the middle and end of a word as a retainment of Middle Breton ð or θ where the other dialects substituted d or z (e.g. in hiddiù [hiːðiw] ("today") which would be hiziv [hiːziw] or hidiv [hiːdiv] in the other dialects (cf. Welsh heddiw [hɛðɪu̯])). The dialect also has a tendency to close vowels, places stress on the final syllables of words (as in French and Middle Breton), rather than on the penultimate syllable (as in other Breton dialects and Welsh), and (like English) has completely lost its original 2nd person singular pronoun. In 2025, Glottolog reclassified Gwenedeg as its own separate language.

== Tartan ==
As a historic Breton county, Bro-Wened is registered as an official tartan with the Scottish government.

== See also ==
- Domnonia (Domnonée)
- Leon (Léon)
- Cornouaille
