= Conomor =

Breton ruler, king of Dumnonia (fl. c. 540)

Conomor (fl. c. 540), also known as Conomerus or Conomor the Cursed, was an early medieval ruler of Brittany. His name, which has the Welsh cognate Cynfawr, means "Great Dog", but could also indicate "Sea Dog" in early Brythonic. Conomor was notorious for his cruelty, becoming a legendary villain in Breton culture. He is widely regarded as one of the probable sources for the myth of Bluebeard and possibly also of Tristan's uncle King Mark of Cornwall. The wife-beating giant Cormoran may also retain a garbled folk memory of the same character.

Conomor was king of Dumnonia and Prince of Poher. Dumnonia was, at this time, expanding to claim control over all Brythonic territory in Armorica (Brittany). It is difficult to disentangle the Conomor of legend from the historical ruler. As with other early Breton rulers most written information about him comes from the lives of Breton saints.

== Historical record ==
The name Conomor is mentioned in Cornish genealogies, and may have established himself in Brittany after a youth in Cornwall, i.e. Dumnonia. He is mentioned in the Historia Francorum by Gregory of Tours as a mid-6th century Breton count involved in conflicts between the Breton count Chanao and his brother Macliau (in Latin, Macliavus). According to Gregory, after Chanao killed his other brothers, Macliau fled to Conomor. Conomor "hid him in a box underground" which he claimed was Macliau's grave. When Chanao was satisfied he was dead, Macliau was secretly placed in a monastery. After Chanao's death he returned to take over his brother's realm.

Conomor is listed as "prefectus du roi des Francs" in the life of Saint Tugdual and in the life of Saint Paul Aurelian he is called ruler of "different peoples of four languages", which may suggest that his territory included both Brittany and Cornwall. Conomor is said to have been count of Carhaix and to have become king by murdering his predecessor Jonas. He married Jonas' widow, but she later fled from him to seek asylum in the Frankish court with her son Judael. He is later said to have come into conflict with Waroch I, count of Vannes, whose daughter Tryphine he had married after his first wife's death. In unclear circumstances he is said to have murdered Tryphine and later his son by her, Trémeur. Eventually the local bishops were persuaded by Saint Samson to excommunicate Conomor. It is possible that the story of Tréphine and Trémeur is a garbled version of Conomor's attempts to kill Judael, his step-son. According to Lester K. Little, "Conomor was serving as regent for a nephew who was too young to take up the kingship he had inherited; the main grievance against him was his relentless campaign to have the boy killed. Those present in the assembly included Saint Hervé the blind poet and perhaps also Saint Samson of Dol, Saint Gildas, and Saint Teilo of Glamorgan. Against Conomor all those assembled launched an excommunication."

Samson also prevailed on the Frankish king Childebert I to abandon his support for Conomor as protector of the English Channel and to release Judael. After Childebert's death his brother Chlothar I took over the kingdom. Judael then joined an expedition led by Chlothar into Brittany and killed Conomor in a battle in the Monts d'Arrée near Le Relecq, Plounéour-Ménez, which is named from the relics of the victims. Gregory of Tours places these events in the context of conflicts between Chlothar and his rebellious son Chramm:

Chramm presented himself before his father, but later he proved disloyal. And when he saw he could not escape punishment he fled to Brittany and there with his wife and daughters lived in concealment with Chonoober (sic) count of the Bretons...Now king Chlothar was raging against Chramn and marched with army into Brittany against him. Nor was Chramn afraid to come out against his father. And when both armies were gathered and encamped on the same plain and Chramn with the Bretons had marshaled his line against his father, night fell and they refrained from fighting. During the night Chonoober, count of the Bretons, said to Chramn: "I think it wrong for you to fight against your father; allow me tonight to rush upon him and destroy him with all his army." But Chramn would not allow this to be done... When they were fighting on equal terms the count of the Bretons fled and was slain.

The Cynfawr (Conomor) of medieval Welsh tradition is probably unrelated. An obscure figure with the epithet "Cadgaddug" ("Battle-winner"), he appears in the genealogies and one of the Welsh Triads as a descendant of Coel Hen from the Hen Ogledd. It is also unclear whether Cornish evidence points to the same individual as the Breton leader, or to an earlier relative with the same name. Nor, though the link has repeatedly been made, is there evidence that a Cornish monument dating to roughly this period and dedicated to the son of a "Cunomorus" refers to the Conomor who ruled in Brittany.

== In legend ==
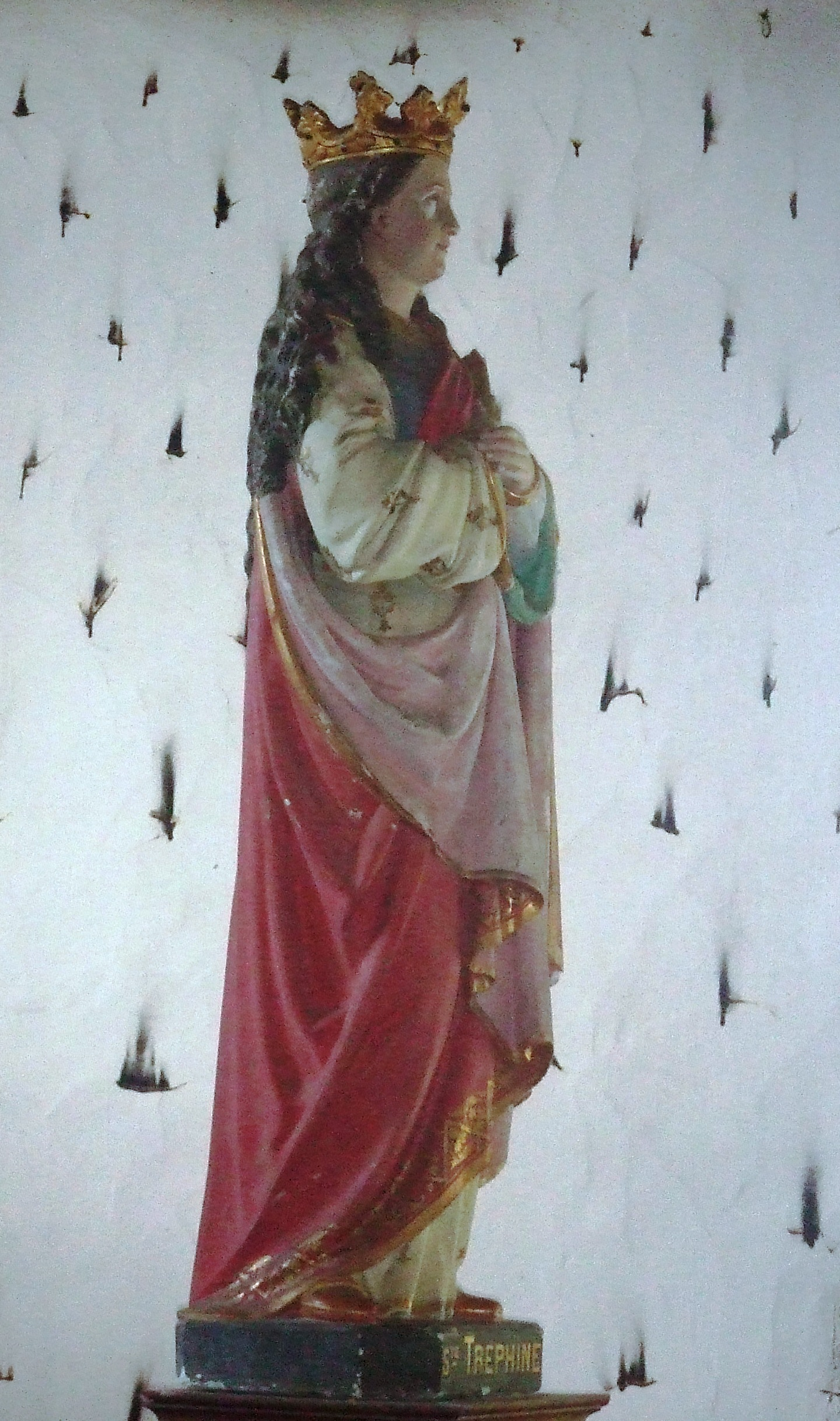
Statue of St Tréphine

=== Myth of Tréphine and Trémeur ===
In legend Conomor's villainy is extended to include the murders of three wives before Tréphine. Tréphine refuses to marry him because of his reputation, but when he threatens to invade her father's lands she agrees, to spare the lives of her father's people. While Conomor is away Tréphine finds a secret room containing relics of the deceased wives. She prays for their souls, and their ghosts appear to her warning her that Conomor will kill her if she becomes pregnant, since a prophecy states that he will be killed by his own son. When he returns he discovers that she is pregnant. Tréphine escapes with magical aid from the dead wives and gives birth in a forest. She hides her son before Conomor catches her and beheads her. However Saint Gildas finds her and miraculously restores her to life. She and her son both live lives of saintly retirement, but after Tréphine's death Conomor eventually finds Trémeur and kills him.

Both Tréphine and her son Trémeur are deemed saints in Brittany, and there are many churches dedicated to them. The village of Sainte-Tréphine is named for the former. It has been suggested that the story of Bluebeard derives from this myth.

=== Myth of Tristan ===
An inscription in Cornwall which – it has been suggested – includes the names of Conomor and Tristan has led to the suggestion that Conomor is the origin of the figure of King Mark in the Tristan legend. According to the archaeologist Ralegh Radford and the Arthurian specialist André de Mandach, it reads "Drustanus hic iacit cunomori filius" (here lies Tristan, son of Conomor). However, multiple earlier transcriptions fail to support this reading, and instead suggest the monument was erected in memory of one "Clusius". The "Drustanus" interpretation requires the reading of what others have taken to be "CL," written in the same script as the remainder of the text, as a "D" written in uncial script or else as a normal upper-case D written backwards.

The historian Léon Fleuriot argues that Conomor probably held sway in both Britain and Brittany:

He is often presented as a vassal of Childebert: a praefectus, said the Chronicle of Saint Brieuc: "Comorus tyrannus, praefectus Francorum regis." Comonor appears to have been a Britto-Roman. The Life of St. Paul refers to "king Marc", or princeps Marc, or, in his full name, Marcus Quonomorius.

The writer Jean Markale developed this argument, suggesting that the Tristan legend originated in Ireland, but that the names of the characters derive from actual people in Cornish history whose lives involved "the rivalry of a father and son for the same woman", the father being Conomor/Mark and the son Tristan. However, it has also been argued that this Cornish Conomor was probably the Breton leader's great grandfather.
