= Waroch I =

Waroch I (Breton: Gwereg; modern French: Guérech; d. c. 550) was an early ruler of the Bro Wened (Vannetais) in southern Brittany. It is unclear whether he or his grandson Waroch II is the namesake of the region.

== Life ==
Waroch controlled the hinterland of the region formerly held by the Veneti Gauls, without actually gaining control of Darioritum itself. The settlement became a Gallo-Frankish enclave before later being conquered as the Breton city Gwened. It forms the core of Vannes in modern France.

He seems to have been granted the formal title of "count".

Map of Brittany traditional regions in the Ancient world. Violet-coloured areas are the ones ruled by Waroch I

According to some authors, the name Waroch I and the other names with which he's historically known are eponymous of Bro-erec. After the early twenty years of 6th century, during which he consolidated his control on a large part of Gallic areas, Waroch/Gwereg could conquer large parts of low Loire, until Nantes. A lot of courtesy romance spoke of Waroch I's gesta making confusion with the legendary character of Erec by Chrétien de Troyes and it could be important that, among all named countries in his Erec et Enide, the one and only identifiable is Nantes. Moreover, in this town, a ceremony in which Erec has been crowned and marries "symbolically" Enide (personification of town Vannes: Enide>Gwened>Venedis/Vannes) takes place.

== Family ==
Waroch had several children by an unknown wife:

- Chanao I, who succeeded him on his death
- Macliau, Bishop of Vannes, who succeeded his brother
- Saint Tryphine, who married Conomor the Cursed, count of Poher
- Three other sons, killed by their brother Chanao.

When Waroch died, a fight between his descendants took place. Canao tried to kill Macliau and Conomor the Cursed helped him to keep him safe. Probably he took this role because he was the oldest family member. But Conomor and Waroch had not pacific relations before Conomor married Tryphine. For example, Saint Hernin's hermitage in Duault, no longer from Carhaix/Vorgium, was destroyed because of the wars between “le roi de Bretagne Dumnonée e le Comte de Cournouaille Comorre”.

Saint Gildas was a great friend and counselor of the king and, according to the legend, he tried to convert the cursed Conomor even though unsuccessful.

Armorican version of Saint Gildas biography says he went in the area in order to spend his old age and he would be asked by Waroch for founding a monastery "apud Mons Ruvisium" (the Ancient Saint-Gildas-de-Rhuys abbey), on Vannes gulf. During this period, Gildas helped in stopping the conflict between Conomor and Waroch by supporting the marriage Conomor and Tryphine.

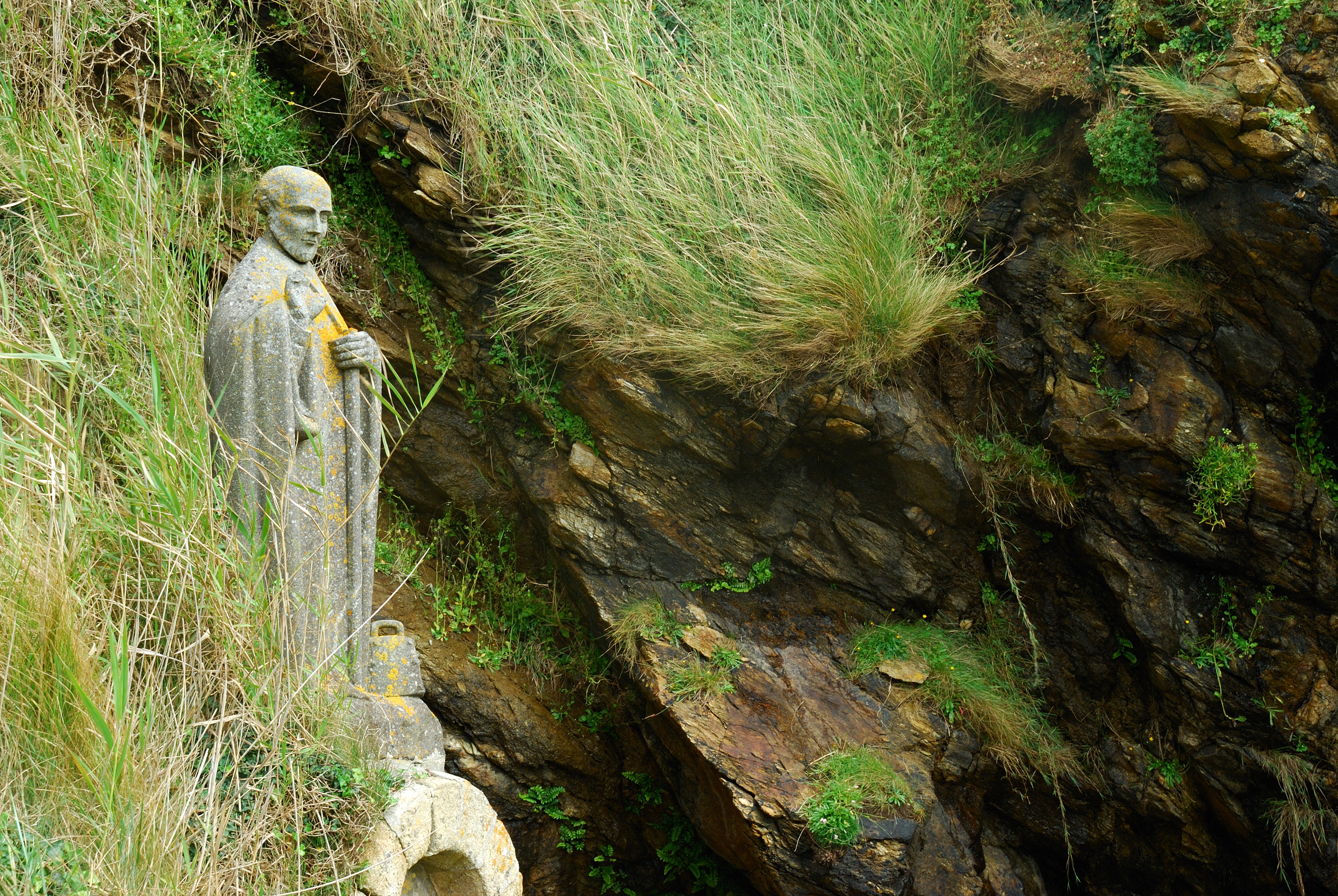
Saint-Gildas' statue, Saint-Gildas-de-Rhuys.

Waroch II, Macliau's son and Waroch I's nephew, conquered again some of the areas owned by his grandfather.

When Judael, Conomor's step-son, re-established (at least officially) his dynasty power upon Armorican Dumnonia, he however had a great loss: Consul status undertook a compromise for Francs. He, his descendants, and Waroch's descendants would be no longer at the same level as a king. Instead, it was under Childebert. They would be simple vassals subdued to Salian Franks dynasty.

== Bibliography ==
- Guido Codecasa, "Alla ricerca della Storia: Gottfried von Straßburg e il suo Tristano e Isotta”, in I quaderni de l'eclettico N°4, Milano, aprile 2017.
- Anonimo (1832). "Dei conti e duchi di Bretagna". L'Arte di verificare le date dei fatti storici delle inscrizioni delle cronache. Vol. 13 (I ed.). p. 241.
- Katharine Sarah Macquoid, Through Brittany, 1877, Londra
