= Felix of Rhuys =

Breton Benedictine hermit and abbot

Saint Felix of Rhuys
- Died: 1038
- Honored in: Catholic Church; Eastern Orthodox Church
- Feast: March 4

Saint Felix of Rhuys (died 1038) was a Breton Benedictine hermit and abbot, who re-founded Saint-Gildas-de-Rhuys Abbey.

== Life ==
Felix was born of wealthy parents in Quimper around 970. He had a great regard for Saint Paul Aurelian who had built a monastery at Lampoul on Ushant, and whose relics, around 960, had been translated to Fleury Abbey. Felix became a recluse on Ushant. He left his hermitage during the Norman invasions to take refuge at Fleury in Saint-Benoît-sur-Loire, where he was welcomed by Abbo of Fleury.

Geoffrey I, Duke of Brittany asked the Abbot of Fleury to re-establish Rhuys Abbey, which had been founded by Saint Gildas in the 6th century on the Gulf of Morbihan, and had been destroyed by the Normans. Father Abbot entrusted Felix with the task of rebuilding. The original abbey had been built in wood on the remains of a Roman oppidum; Felix built in stone. Begun in 1008, the reconstruction ended in 1032 with the consecration of the church by Judicaël, bishop of Vannes and brother of the Duke. Félix died on 4 March 1038.

His feast day is 4 March.
