= Arclid =

Village in Cheshire, England

Coordinates: 53.156140°N 2.319984°W

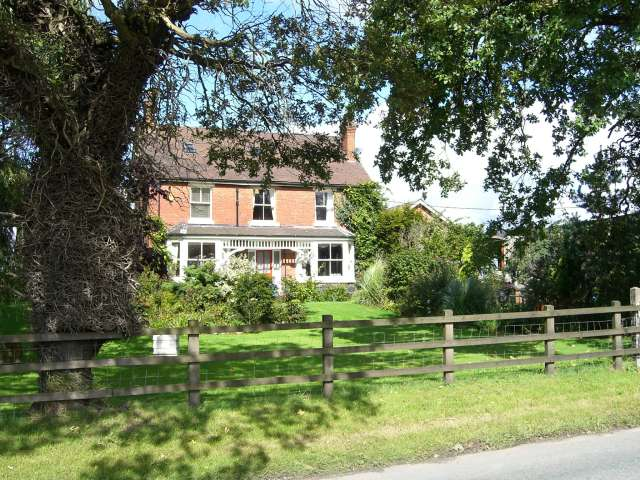
- Springbank Farm

- Location within Cheshire
- Population: 276 (2011)
- OS grid reference: SJ787621
- Civil parish: Arclid
- Unitary authority: Cheshire East
- Ceremonial county: Cheshire
- Region: North West
- Country: England
- Sovereign state: United Kingdom
- Post town: Sandbach
- Postcode district: CW11
- Dialling code: 01477
- Police: Cheshire
- Fire: Cheshire
- Ambulance: North West
- UK Parliament: Congleton

Arclid is a village and civil parish in the unitary authority of Cheshire East and the ceremonial county of Cheshire, England. It is about 2 miles (3.2 km) east of Sandbach and 5 miles (8.0 km) west of Congleton. The parish had a population of 199 according to the 2001 census, increasing to 276 at the 2011 census.

== History ==
=== Toponymy ===
The first written attestation of Arclid is in 1188, spelled Erclid, with the modern spelling first attested by 1240. In the 20th century, scholars usually attributed the origin of the name to the Old Norse personal name Arnkell, combined with Old English hild ("hillside"). However, the evolution of Arnkell into "Erk-" is problematic and there are no hills in the vicinity of the village, so a Welsh derivation for the name is more probable. Historical linguist Andrew Breeze argues that the name comes from a Brittonic prefix ar-, meaning "land around" and the Old Welsh equivalent of Clud, meaning "pure one". He suggests that Clud, which is cognate with the name of the River Clyde, was the old name of the stream that runs through the village before joining the River Wheelock.

=== Gildas ===
An 11th-century biography of the Romano-British St Gildas states that he was born at a place called Arecluta, which linguist Andrew Breeze argues is Arclid. Gildas was born in the late 5th century, when the area would have been under Welsh control. Gildas may have left the village to study Latin and religion in Chester.

=== Landmarks ===
The village pub, the Legs of Man, is situated on the Newcastle Road. A pub of the same name has stood here since the late 1860s, but the present building dates from 1939 and was designed by J. H. Walters. Originally the pub had a thatched roof, similar to the Bleeding Wolf at Scholar Green, but this caught fire in 1956 and was replaced with tiles. Today it has a mock-Tudor exterior and houses a separate restaurant. There is a large beer garden.

Arclid Hall Farmhouse stands on Hemingshaw Lane and is a Grade II listed building. It dates from around 1700, and is of three storeys of red brick. It is the only building in the civil parish to be listed by English Heritage.

The village at one time had an active airfield.
