= La Trinité-Surzur =

La Trinité-Surzur An Drinded-Surzhur
- Commune
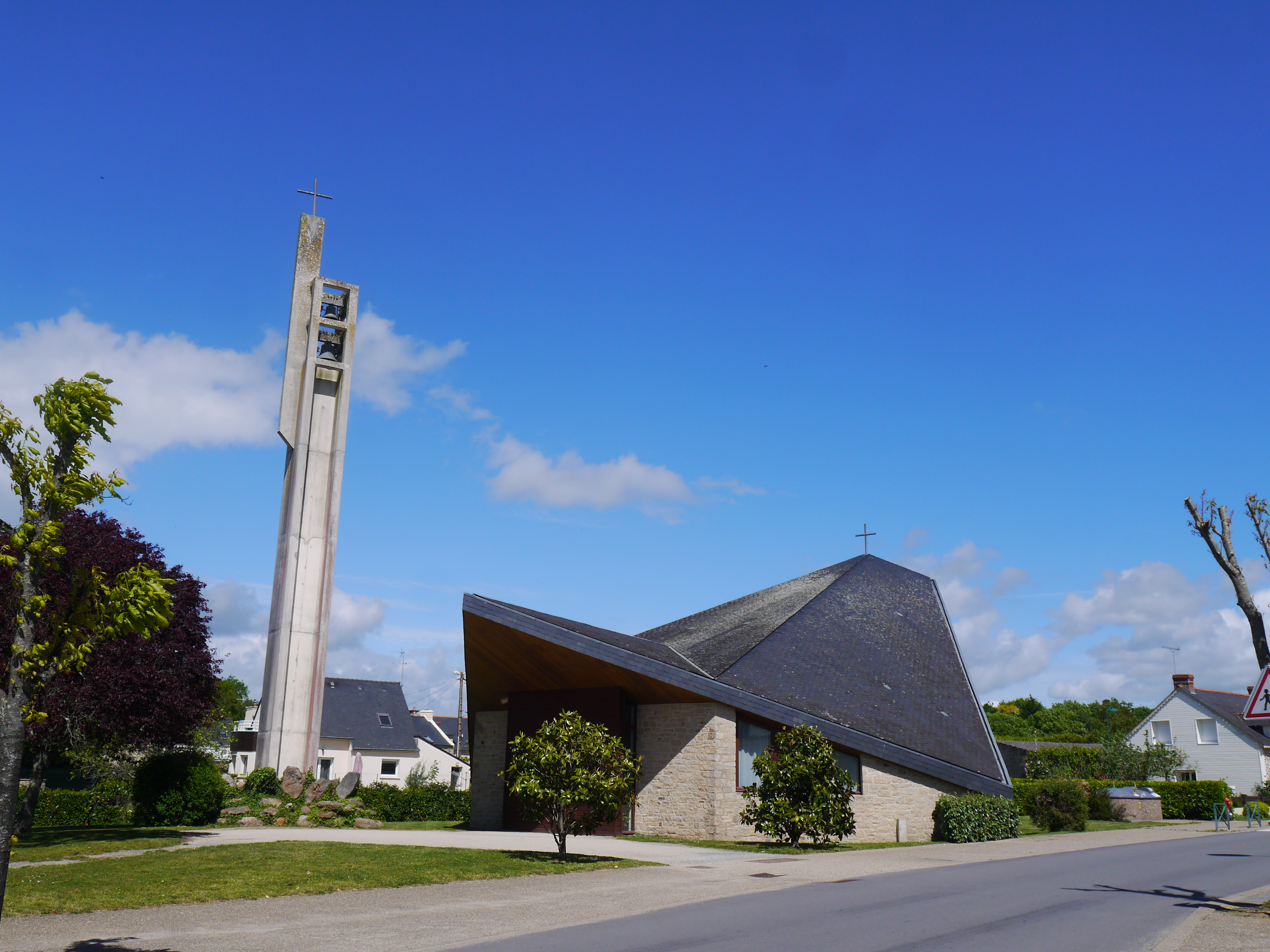
- The church of Saint-Servais and the bell tower.

- Coat of arms
- Location of La Trinité-Surzur
- Location within France Location within Brittany
- Coordinates: 47°36′19″N 2°35′36″W
- Country: France
- Region: Brittany
- Department: Morbihan
- Arrondissement: Vannes
- Canton: Séné
- Intercommunality: Golfe du Morbihan - Vannes Agglomération

Government
  - Mayor (2026–32): Sandrine Cadoret
- Area^{1}: 2.30 km^{2} (0.89 sq mi)
- Highest elevation: 42 m (138 ft)
- Lowest elevation: 14 m (46 ft)
- Population (2023): 1,678
  - Density: 730/km^{2} (1,890/sq mi)
- Time zone: UTC+01:00 (CET)
  - Summer (DST): UTC+02:00 (CEST)
- INSEE/Postal code: 56259 /56190
- ^{1} French Land Register data, which excludes lakes, ponds, glaciers > 1 km^{2} (0.386 sq mi or 247 acres) and river estuaries.

La Trinité-Surzur (French pronunciation: [la tʁinite syʁzyʁ]; Breton: An Drinded-Surzhur) is a commune in the Morbihan department of Brittany in north-western France. Inhabitants of La Trinité-Surzur are called in French Trinitains.

== See also ==
- Communes of the Morbihan department
