= Séné =

Séné Sine
- Commune
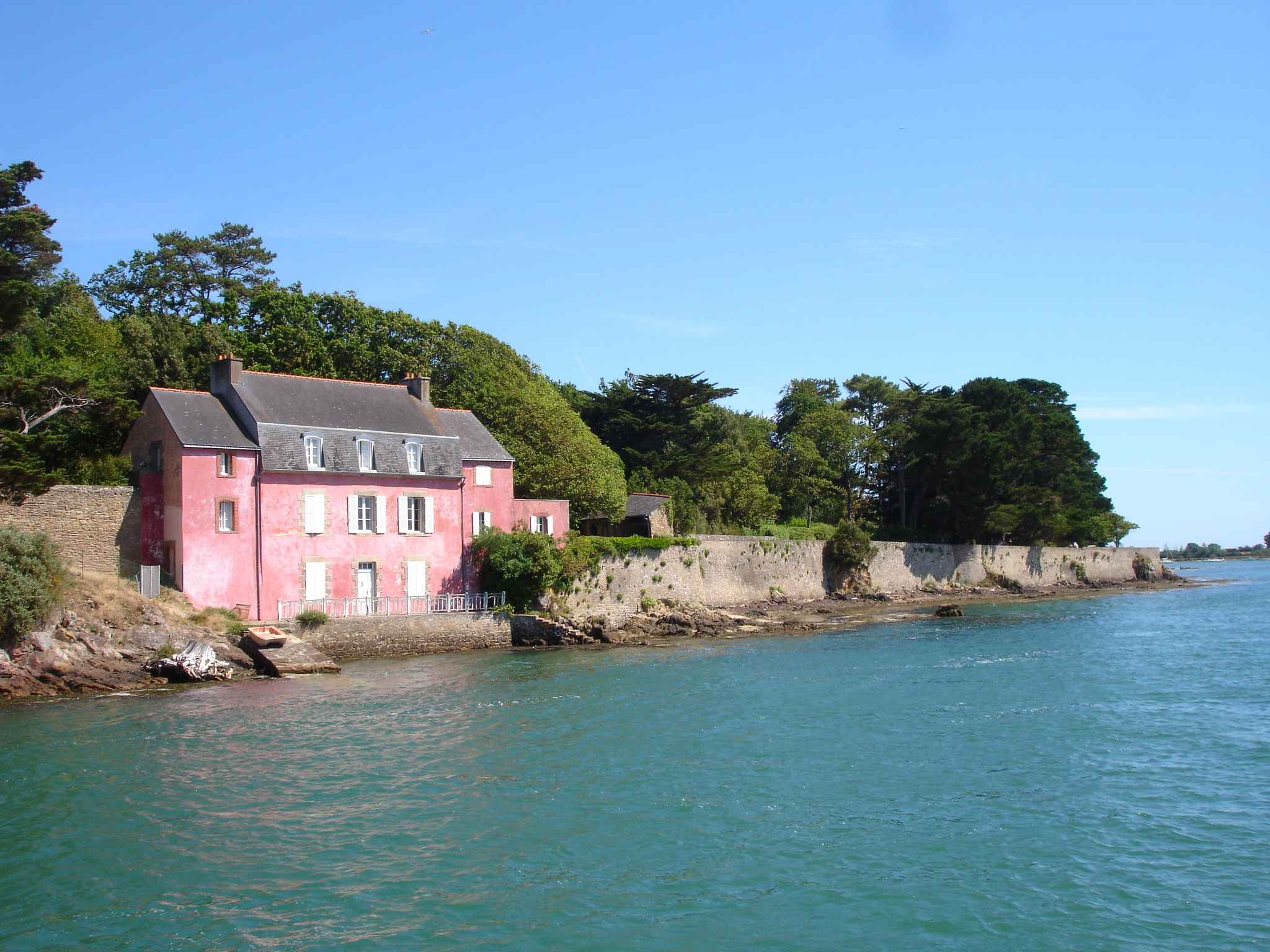
- The pink house, with the entrance to the Vannes River

- Coat of arms
- Location of Séné
- Location within France Location within Brittany
- Coordinates: 47°37′14″N 2°44′09″W
- Country: France
- Region: Brittany
- Department: Morbihan
- Arrondissement: Vannes
- Canton: Séné
- Intercommunality: Golfe du Morbihan - Vannes Agglomération

Government
  - Mayor (2026–32): Clément Le Franc
- Area^{1}: 19.94 km^{2} (7.70 sq mi)
- Highest elevation: 21 m (69 ft)
- Lowest elevation: 0 m (0 ft)
- Population (2023): 9,554
  - Density: 479.1/km^{2} (1,241/sq mi)
- Time zone: UTC+01:00 (CET)
  - Summer (DST): UTC+02:00 (CEST)
- INSEE/Postal code: 56243 /56860
- ^{1} French Land Register data, which excludes lakes, ponds, glaciers > 1 km^{2} (0.386 sq mi or 247 acres) and river estuaries.

Séné (French pronunciation: [sene]; Breton: Sine) is a commune in the Morbihan department of Brittany in north-western France.

== Population ==
The inhabitants of Séné are known in French as Sinagots.

Historical population
Year	Pop.	±% p.a.
1968	2,744	—
1975	3,596	+3.94%
1982	4,599	+3.58%
1990	6,180	+3.76%
1999	7,868	+2.72%
2007	8,095	+0.36%
2012	8,781	+1.64%
2017	8,947	+0.38%
2023	9,554	+1.10%
Source: INSEE

== Breton language ==
The municipality launched a linguistic plan through Ya d'ar brezhoneg on 22 September 2006.

== See also ==
- Communes of the Morbihan department
