= Arzon =

Commune in Brittany, France

Arzon Arzhon-Rewiz
- Commune
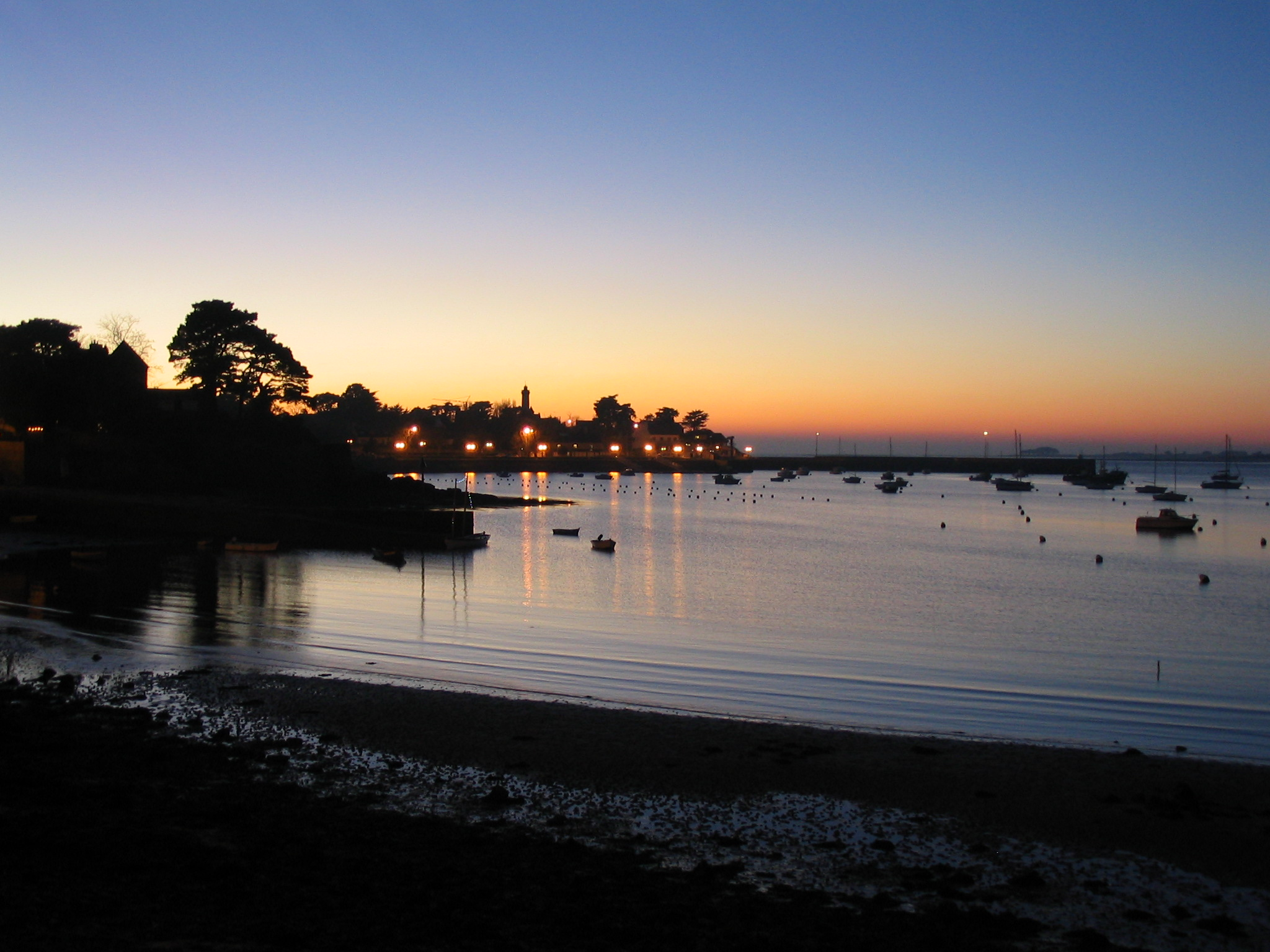
- Port-Navalo

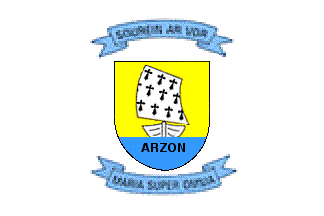
- Flag Coat of arms
- Location of Arzon
- Location within France Location within Brittany
- Coordinates: 47°32′55″N 2°53′25″W
- Country: France
- Region: Brittany
- Department: Morbihan
- Arrondissement: Vannes
- Canton: Séné
- Intercommunality: Golfe du Morbihan - Vannes Agglomération

Government
  - Mayor (2026–32): Olivier Denfer
- Area^{1}: 8.93 km^{2} (3.45 sq mi)
- Highest elevation: 36 m (118 ft)
- Lowest elevation: 0 m (0 ft)
- Population (2023): 2,271
  - Density: 254/km^{2} (659/sq mi)
- Time zone: UTC+01:00 (CET)
  - Summer (DST): UTC+02:00 (CEST)
- INSEE/Postal code: 56005 /56640
- ^{1} French Land Register data, which excludes lakes, ponds, glaciers > 1 km^{2} (0.386 sq mi or 247 acres) and river estuaries.

Arzon (French pronunciation: [aʁzɔ̃]) or Arzhon-Rewiz in Breton (Breton pronunciation: [aʁxɔ̃n rewis]) is a commune located at the extremity of the Rhuys peninsula in the Morbihan department in the Brittany region in northwestern France.

== Geography ==
Arzon is said to be the French village with the longest coastal area in France (see map). Arzon marks the east entrance to the Gulf of Morbihan.

There are two seaside resorts in the commune:

- Port-Navalo (Porzh Noalou Breton pronunciation: [pɔʁx nœa'lœɥ]), dating from the nineteenth century
- Le Crouesty (Ar C'hroesti Breton pronunciation: [œr xʁœes'tɛj]), in constant development since the 1970s

Several hamlets are located on the territory of the commune: Monteno, Kerners, Béninze, Tumiac, Kerjouanno.

== Tourism ==
Arzon is a popular summer resort. In winter, fall and spring, only two "gendarmes" (French military police) work in Arzon, but in the summer there are far more to cope with the influx of tourists.

== Population ==
Historical population
Year	Pop.	±% p.a.
1968	1,308	—
1975	1,326	+0.20%
1982	1,476	+1.54%
1990	1,754	+2.18%
1999	2,056	+1.78%
2007	2,173	+0.69%
2012	2,103	−0.65%
2017	2,073	−0.29%
2023	2,271	+1.53%
Source: INSEE

Inhabitants of Arzon are called Arzonais in French.

== International relations ==
Arzon is twinned with Lahinch, Ireland.

== See also ==
- Communes of the Morbihan department
