= N. J. Higham =

British archaeologist, historian, and academic (born 1951)

Nicholas J. Higham FSA
- Born: Nicholas John Higham; 1951 (age 74–75)
- Occupation: Academic
- Title: Emeritus professor

Academic background
- Education: University of Manchester
- Thesis: (1977)

Academic work
- Discipline: Archaeology
- Sub-discipline: Early medieval England; Gender history; Landscape history
- Institutions: University of Manchester

Nicholas John Higham (born 1951) is a British archaeologist, historian, and academic. He was Professor of Early Medieval and Landscape History at the University of Manchester, and is now an emeritus professor.

Higham was trained as an archaeologist at Manchester, receiving his Doctor of Philosophy (PhD) degree in 1977. He taught at Manchester from 1977 to 2011.

== Bibliography ==
- with Barri Jones, The Carvetti, Sutton (Gloucester, England), 1985, new edition, 1991.
- The Northern Counties to AD 1000, Regional History of England, Longman, (New York, NY), 1986.
- Rome, Britain, and the Anglo-Saxons, Seaby (London, England), 1992.
- The Kingdom of Northumbria: AD 350-1100, Sutton (Gloucester, England), 1993.
- The Origins of Cheshire, Manchester University Press (Manchester, England), 1993.
- An English Empire: Bede and the Early Anglo-Saxon Kings, Manchester University Press (Manchester, England), 1995.
- The English Conquest: Gildas and Britain in the Fifth Century, Manchester University Press (Manchester, England), 1994. (review by Christopher A. Snyder)
- The Convert Kings: Power and Religious Affiliation in Early Anglo-Saxon England, Manchester University Press (Manchester, England), 1997.
- The Death of Anglo-Saxon England, Sutton (Gloucester, England), 1997.
- The Norman Conquest, Sutton (Gloucester, England), 1998.
- King Arthur: Myth-making and History, Routledge (New York, NY), 2002.
- A Frontier Landscape: The North-West in the Middle Ages, Windgather Press (Oxford, England), 2004.
- with Martin J. Ryan, The Anglo-Saxon World, Yale University Press (New Haven, CT), 2015.
- King Arthur: The Making of the Legend, Yale University Press (New Haven, CT), 2018.
- How England Began: From Roman Britain to the Anglo-Saxons, Yale University Press (New Haven, CT), 2026.

== Honours and prizes ==
- Elected Fellow of the Society of Antiquaries of London (FSA) on 11 November 1989
