= Surzur =

Surzur Surzhur
- Commune
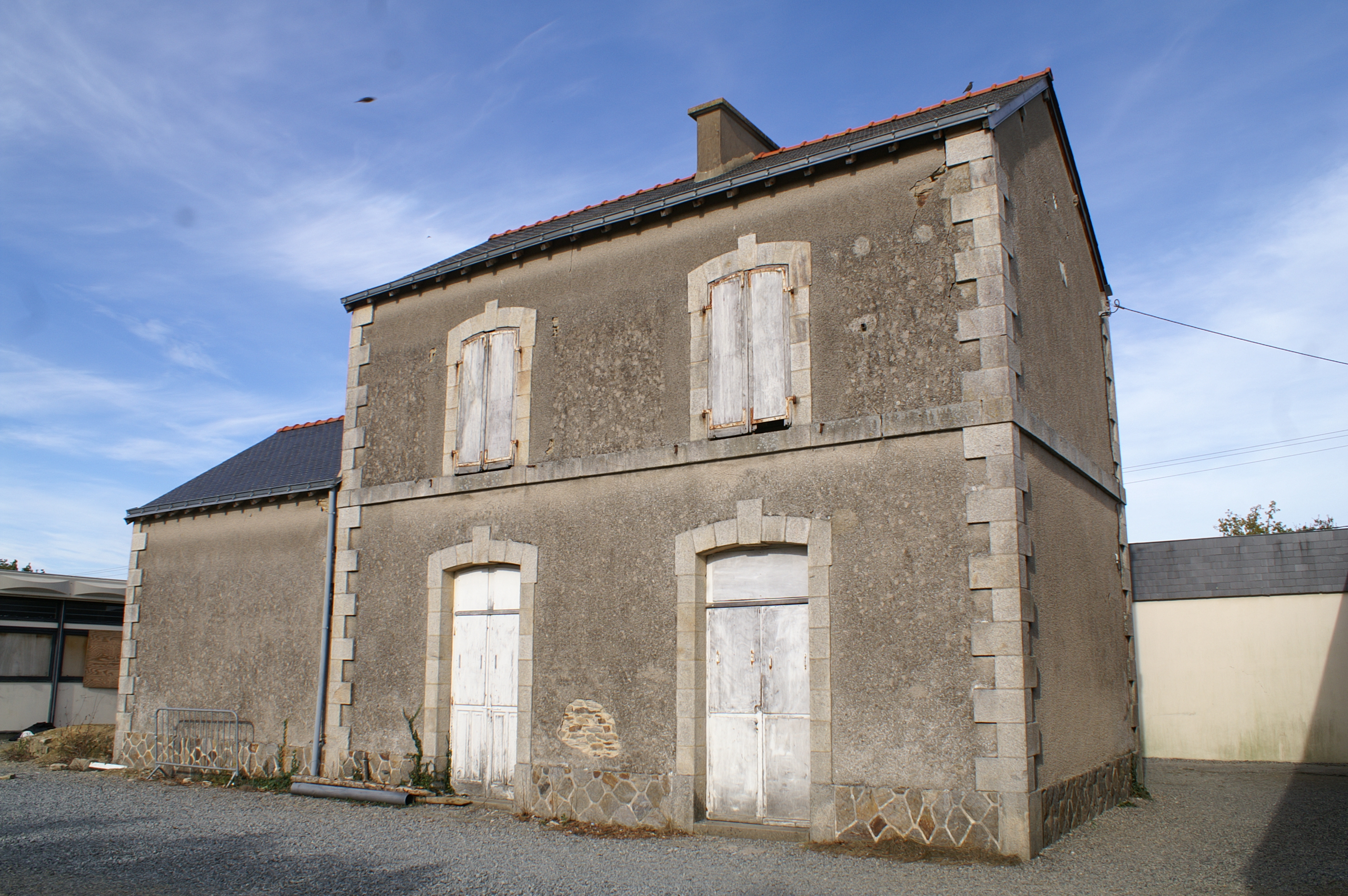
- The old building of Surzur station

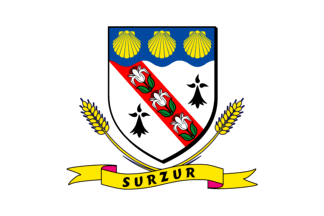
- Flag Coat of arms
- Location of Surzur
- Location within France Location within Brittany
- Coordinates: 47°34′44″N 2°37′43″W
- Country: France
- Region: Brittany
- Department: Morbihan
- Arrondissement: Vannes
- Canton: Séné
- Intercommunality: Golfe du Morbihan - Vannes Agglomération

Government
  - Mayor (2026–32): Noëlle Chenot
- Area^{1}: 57.29 km^{2} (22.12 sq mi)
- Highest elevation: 42 m (138 ft)
- Lowest elevation: 0 m (0 ft)
- Population (2023): 5,211
  - Density: 90.96/km^{2} (235.6/sq mi)
- Time zone: UTC+01:00 (CET)
  - Summer (DST): UTC+02:00 (CEST)
- INSEE/Postal code: 56248 /56450
- ^{1} French Land Register data, which excludes lakes, ponds, glaciers > 1 km^{2} (0.386 sq mi or 247 acres) and river estuaries.

Surzur (French pronunciation: [syʁzyʁ]; Breton: Surzhur) is a commune in the Morbihan department of Brittany, in north-western France.

== Demographics ==
Inhabitants of Surzur are called in French Surzurois.

Historical population
Year	Pop.	±% p.a.
1968	1,461	—
1975	1,452	−0.09%
1982	1,658	+1.91%
1990	2,081	+2.88%
1999	2,434	+1.76%
2007	3,276	+3.78%
2012	3,927	+3.69%
2017	4,429	+2.44%
2023	5,211	+2.75%
Source: INSEE

== Breton language ==
In 2008, there was 11,42% of the children attended the bilingual schools in primary education.

== See also ==
- Communes of the Morbihan department
