= Gildas the Albanian =

- Died: 512; Glastonbury, England
- Known for: Supposed British saint

Saint Gildas the Albanian also known as Gildas the Scot, is a spurious early British saint. Apparently identical with Saint Gildas (known as Gildas the Wise or Gildas the Historian), he was invented in the 17th century to explain away inconsistencies in medieval sources.

== Narrative ==
Gildas was reportedly the son of Caunus, king of some southern provinces in North Britain. According to legend his father was killed in war by king Arthur. According to Alban Butler (1798),

St Gildas improved temporal afflictions into the greatest spiritual advantages, and, despising a false and treacherous world, aspired with his whole heart to an heavenly kingdom. Having engaged himself in a monastic state, he retired with St Cado, abbot of Llan-carvan into certain desert islands, from whence they were drove by pirates from the Orcades. Two islands called Ronech and Ecni afforded him for some time a happy retreat, which he forsook to preach to sinners the obligation of doing penance, and to invite all men to the happy state of divine love. After discharging this apostolical function for several years, he retired to the South-West part of Britain into the abbey of Glastenbury, where he died and was buried in 512. William of Malmesbury and John Fordun mention his prophecies and miracles.

== Identification with Saint Gildas the Wise ==
"Gildas the Albanian" was invented by British historians of the 17th and 18th century, including Bishop James Ussher and Alban Butler, in an attempt to explain inconsistencies in references made by historical sources and vitae to the 5th/6th century British writer "Gildas the Wise." This was founded on a belief that Gildas the Wise was born in AD 494 and died in AD 570, and wrote his De Excidio et Conquestu Britanniae between AD 564 and 570. Gildas the Albanian, Butler and others believed, lived much earlier, dying in AD 512.

By 1876, this theory had been dismissed, after it was noted that the details of the lives of the two Saints named Gildas were broadly the same.

Mabillon considered that there was only one Gildas...It is, however, impossible to compare these lives [biographies purportedly of 'Saint Gildas the Wise' and 'Saint Gildas the Albanian'] without seeing that they relate to the same person...the confusion has arisen, in this as in everything relating to Welsh history, from not discriminating between his acts compiled before Geoffrey of Monmouth's fabulous history appeared, and those which bear the impress of that work...additions which have led to the solution of two Gildas', but which may more reasonably be rejected as spurious.

Robert Chambers, summing up the invention and abolition of "Gildas the Albanian" in Chambers Book of Days (1883), observed:

Such is the outline of the story of St Gildas, which, in its details, is so full of inconsistencies and absurdities, that many writers have tried to solve the difficulty by supposing that there were two or several saints of the name of Gildas, whose histories have been mixed up together. They give to one the title of Gildas Badonicus, or the Historian, because, in the tracts attributed to him, he says that he was born in the year when King Arthur defeated the Saxons in the battle of Mount Badon, in Somersetshire; the other they call Gildas the Albanian or Scot, supposing that he was the one who was born at Alcluyd. The first has also been called Gildas the Wise... in the great eagerness of the middle ages to find saints, the name [of Gildas] was seized upon with avidity; and in different places where they wished to profit by possessing his relics, they composed legends of him, intended to justify their claim, which therefore agreed but partly with each other. Altogether, the legend of St. Gildas is one of the most mysterious and controvertible in the whole Roman Calendar, and its only real interest arises from the circumstance of the existence of a book written in this island, and claiming so great an antiquity.

Modern historians believe there was only one Gildas, the author of De Excidio, about whom little is reliably known, and that he lived earlier than was supposed by Butler and other 18th century historians: "it is unlikely that Gildas wrote [De Excidio...] before 480/490 or much after about 550".

== Sources ==
- Butler, Alban (1798), The Lives of the Primitive Fathers, Martyrs, and Other Principal Saints... by the Rev. Alban Butler..., J. Moir
- Chambers, Robert (1883), The Book of Days: A Miscellany of Popular Antiquities in Connection with the Calendar, Including Anecdote, Biography, & History, Curiosities of Literature and Oddities of Human Life and Character, W. & R. Chambers
- Skene, William Forbes (1876), Celtic Scotland: A History of Ancient Alban, Volume 1, D. Douglas
- Halsall, Guy (2014), Worlds of Arthur Facts & Fictions of the Dark Ages, OUP Oxford, ISBN 978-0-19-965817-6
