= Canton of Séné =

Coordinates: 47.62°N 2.73°W

The canton of Séné is an administrative division of the Morbihan department, northwestern France. It was created at the French canton reorganisation which came into effect in March 2015. Its seat is in Séné.

It consists of the following communes:

1. Arzon
2. Le Hézo
3. Saint-Armel
4. Saint-Gildas-de-Rhuys
5. Sarzeau
6. Séné
7. Surzur
8. Theix-Noyalo
9. Le Tour-du-Parc
10. La Trinité-Surzur
