= Gwereg =

Gwereg is a Breton masculine given name. In historical use, it is often encountered under various spellings of its Frenchified forms "Waroch" and "Guérech".

It may refer to either:

- Waroch I
- Waroch II
