= Tryphine =

Sixth-century Breton saint

Saint Tryphine
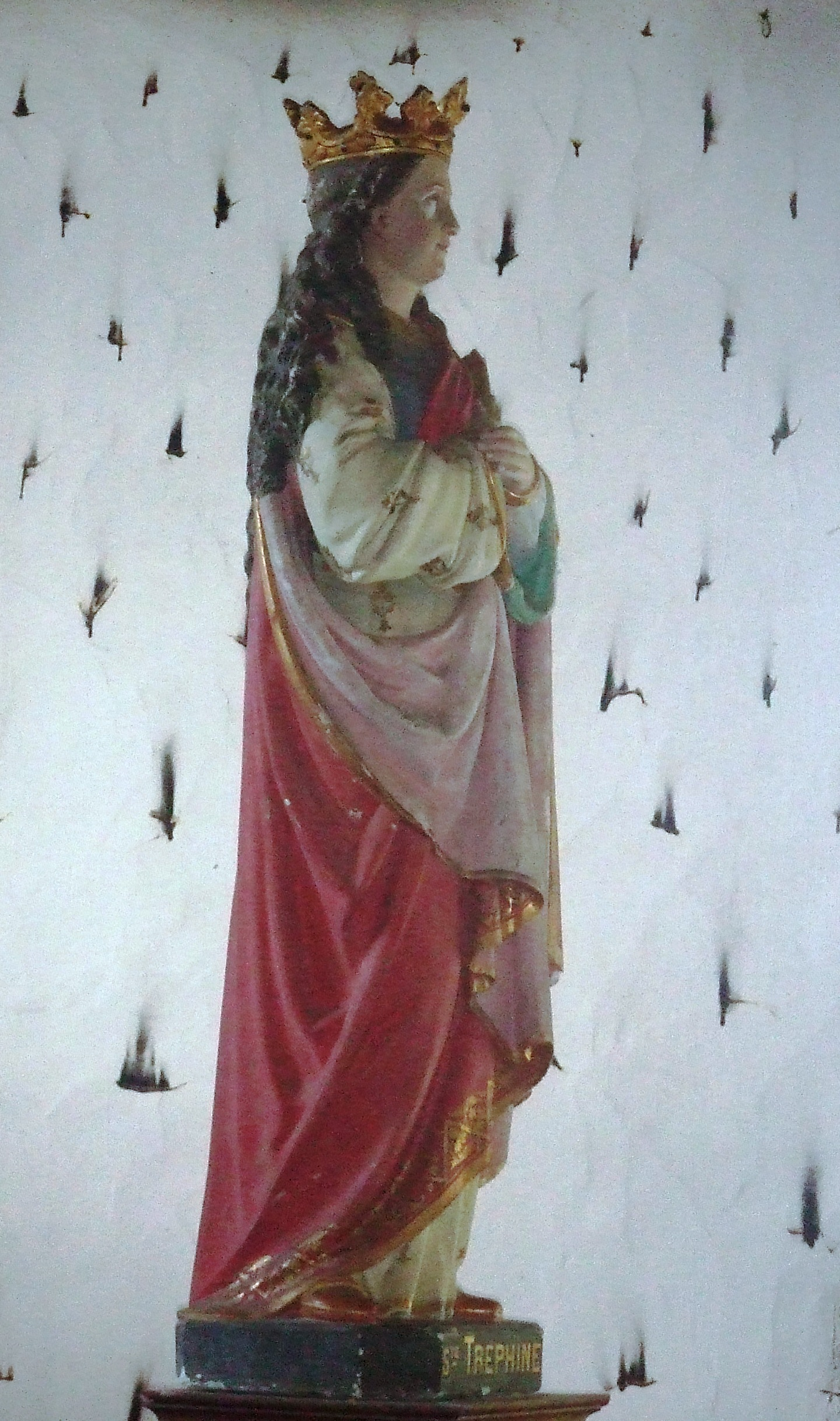
- Statue of St Tryphine in Côtes-d'Armor, Brittany (c. 1850)

Martyr
- Born: c. 530; Vannes, Brittany
- Died: c. 550; Brittany
- Venerated in: Roman Catholicism
- Feast: 7 November; 21 July (Tryphine & Tremeur)
- Attributes: beheaded woman
- Patronage: pregnant women, sick children

Saint Tryphine (also spelled Trifine, Triphine and Tréphine) is a semi-legendary Breton saint whose life is often considered to be the basis of the story of Bluebeard. In Brittany she is widely revered as a patron saint of sick children and those whose birth is overdue. The legend of Saint Tryphine probably derives from a historical individual who was the wife of the early Breton ruler Conomor.

== Historical background ==
Conomor is said to have married Tryphine, the daughter of his ally Waroch I, but seems later to have violently abused and then murdered her. Conomor was later killed in battle with a rival, and became a legendary villain in Breton history. Tryphine was elevated to the position of a martyred saint, along with her son Tremeur, and there are many churches dedicated to them. The village of Sainte-Tréphine is named for the former.

== Myth of Tryphine and Tremeur ==
In later legend Conomor's villainy is extended to include the murders of three wives before Tryphine. Tryphine refuses to marry him because of his reputation, but when he threatens to invade her father's lands she agrees, to spare the lives of her father's people. While Conomor is away Tryphine finds a secret room containing relics of the deceased wives. She prays for their souls, and their ghosts appear to her warning her that Conomor will kill her if she becomes pregnant. Depending on the version of the myth this is either because a prophecy states that he will be killed by his own son or because he is only interested in his wives as providers of sexual pleasure.

When he returns he discovers that she is pregnant. Tryphine escapes with magical aid from the dead wives and gives birth in a forest. She hides her son before Conomor catches her and beheads her. However, Saint Gildas finds her and miraculously restores her to life. She and her son both live lives of saintly retirement, but after Tryphine's death Conomor eventually finds Tremeur and kills him. In other versions Conomor is killed when his castle miraculously collapses onto him.

It has been suggested that the story of Bluebeard derives from this myth.

== Myth of Tryphine and King Arthur ==
The folklorist François-Marie Luzel collected a mystery play about Tryphine and King Arthur. In this story Arthur replaced Comonor as Tryphine's husband and Tryphine acquires some of the characteristics of Guinevere. The plot involves Tryphine's evil brother, Kervoura, who schemes to inherit the kingdom from Arthur. When he discovers that Tryphine is pregnant, he decides to eliminate Arthur's bloodline. As Tryphine is about to give birth, Kevoura kidnaps her and hides the child. He then accuses Tryphine of murdering her son and uses forged evidence to implicate her in a supposed plot to kill Arthur. Arthur orders Tryphine's arrest, but she escapes and hides for six years working as a servant. She is eventually discovered and brought back to court. Arthur now accepts her innocence and they have a daughter together. Kervoura then accuses her of adultery, using bribed witnesses. She is condemned to be executed. However, her son Tremeur has now grown up and has escaped from his captors to return. He reveals himself just as Tryphine is about to be beheaded by the executioner and challenges Kervoura to a duel. He kills Kervoura, who confesses his crimes before he dies. Arthur and Tryphine are reunited.
