= Le Tour-du-Parc =

Le Tour-du-Parc Tro-Park
- Commune
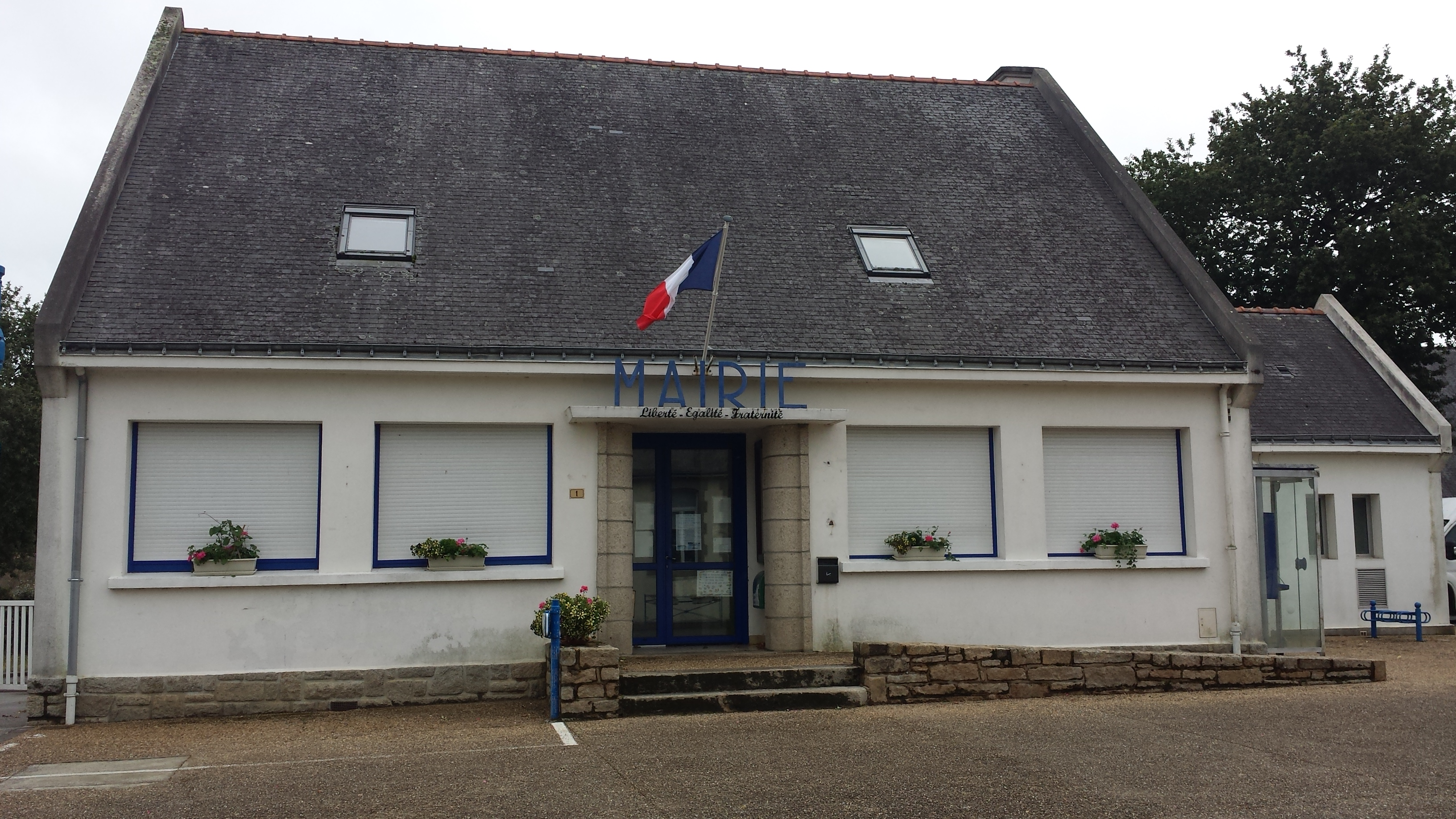
- Town hall

- Coat of arms
- Location of Le Tour-du-Parc
- Location within France Location within Brittany
- Coordinates: 47°31′36″N 2°38′39″W
- Country: France
- Region: Brittany
- Department: Morbihan
- Arrondissement: Vannes
- Canton: Séné
- Intercommunality: Golfe du Morbihan - Vannes Agglomération

Government
  - Mayor (2026–32): Isabelle Louis
- Area^{1}: 9.30 km^{2} (3.59 sq mi)
- Highest elevation: 17 m (56 ft)
- Lowest elevation: 0 m (0 ft)
- Population (2023): 1,343
  - Density: 144/km^{2} (374/sq mi)
- Time zone: UTC+01:00 (CET)
  - Summer (DST): UTC+02:00 (CEST)
- INSEE/Postal code: 56252 /56370
- ^{1} French Land Register data, which excludes lakes, ponds, glaciers > 1 km^{2} (0.386 sq mi or 247 acres) and river estuaries.

Le Tour-du-Parc (French pronunciation: [lə tuʁ dy paʁk]; Breton: Tro-Park) is a commune in the Morbihan department of Brittany in north-western France. Inhabitants of Le Tour-du-Parc are called in French Parcais.

== See also ==
- Communes of the Morbihan department
