= Sainte-Tréphine =

Sainte-Tréphine Sant-Trifin
- Commune
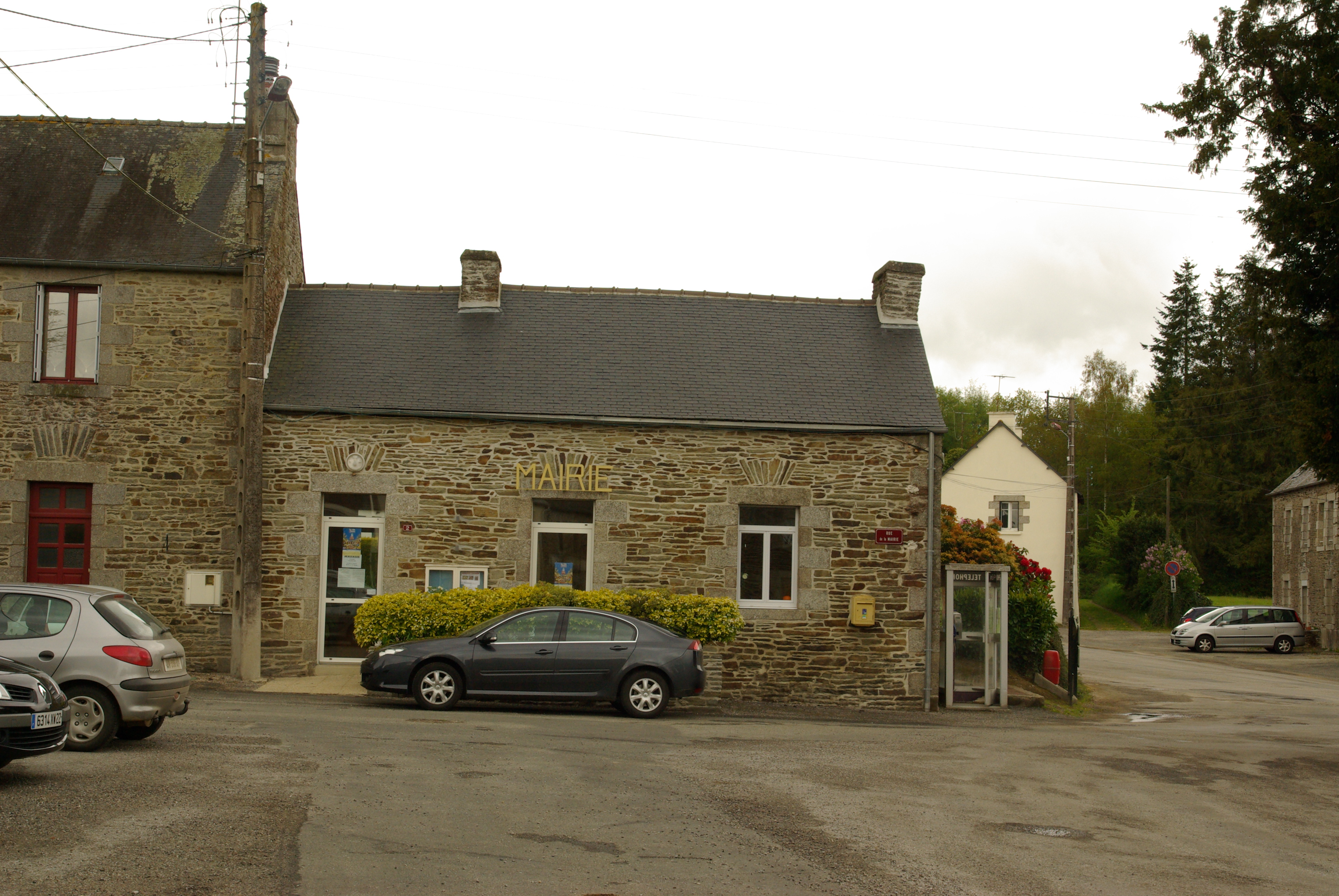
- The town hall of Sainte-Tréphine
- Location of Sainte-Tréphine
- Location within France Location within Brittany
- Coordinates: 48°16′14″N 3°09′10″W
- Country: France
- Region: Brittany
- Department: Côtes-d'Armor
- Arrondissement: Guingamp
- Canton: Rostrenen
- Intercommunality: Kreiz-Breizh

Government
  - Mayor (2020–2026): Georges Galardon
- Area^{1}: 12.52 km^{2} (4.83 sq mi)
- Highest elevation: 187 m (614 ft)
- Lowest elevation: 129 m (423 ft)
- Population (2023): 189
  - Density: 15.1/km^{2} (39.1/sq mi)
- Time zone: UTC+01:00 (CET)
  - Summer (DST): UTC+02:00 (CEST)
- INSEE/Postal code: 22331 /22480
- ^{1} French Land Register data, which excludes lakes, ponds, glaciers > 1 km^{2} (0.386 sq mi or 247 acres) and river estuaries.

Sainte-Tréphine (French pronunciation: [sɛ̃t tʁefin]; Breton: Sant-Trifin) is a commune in the Côtes-d'Armor department of Brittany in northwestern France. It is named after Saint Tryphine.

== Population ==
Inhabitants of Sainte-Tréphine are called tréphinois in French.

== See also ==
- Communes of the Côtes-d'Armor department
