= Chram =

Frankish rebel

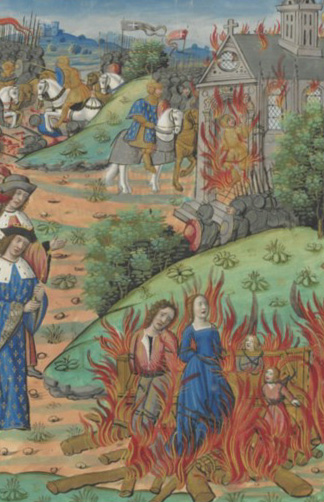
Death of Chramn, Guillaume Crétin, Chroniques Françaises. After 1515, Rouen, France. Bibliothèque Nationale de France.

Chram (also spelled Chramn, Chramm; Old Frankish 'raven'; Latin: Chramnus, modern French: Chramn(e)) (died 561) was the son of Chlothar I, a Merovingian king of the Franks (r. 558–561), and his fifth wife, Chunsina.

Chram rose in rebellion against his father on several occasions. Following one of these rebellions, he fled with his wife and children to the court of Chanao, the ruler of Brittany. In pursuit of Chram, Chlothar defeated the combined forces of Chanao and his son in battle. Chanao was killed, and Chram, delayed in making his escape by sea because of his concern for his family's safety, was captured. Chlothar gave orders to burn them alive, but Chram was strangled and his body was placed in a cottage, which was subsequently burned. Chlothar reportedly died of remorse later that year.

Preceded by Clotaire I	Duke of Aquitaine; 555–560	Succeeded by Clotaire I
