= Saint-Gildas-de-Rhuys =

Saint-Gildas-de-Rhuys Lokentaz (Breton)
- Commune
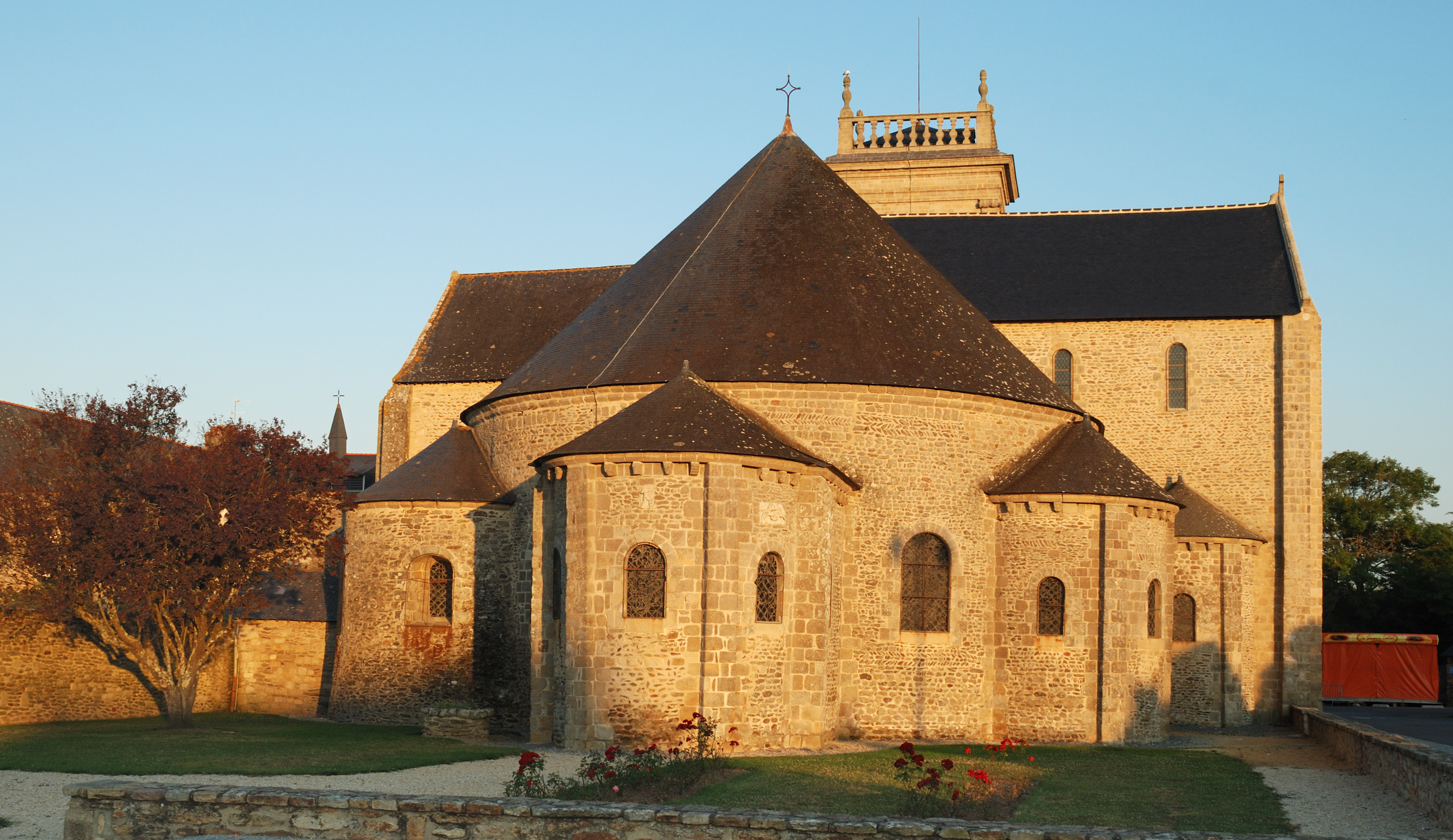
- Saint Gildas church

- Coat of arms
- Location of Saint-Gildas-de-Rhuys
- Location within France Location within Brittany
- Coordinates: 47°30′03″N 2°50′12″W
- Country: France
- Region: Brittany
- Department: Morbihan
- Arrondissement: Vannes
- Canton: Séné
- Intercommunality: Golfe du Morbihan - Vannes Agglomération

Government
  - Mayor (2026–32): Frédéric Pinel
- Area^{1}: 15.28 km^{2} (5.90 sq mi)
- Highest elevation: 42 m (138 ft)
- Lowest elevation: 0 m (0 ft)
- Population (2023): 2,004
  - Density: 131.2/km^{2} (339.7/sq mi)
- Time zone: UTC+01:00 (CET)
  - Summer (DST): UTC+02:00 (CEST)
- INSEE/Postal code: 56214 /56730
- ^{1} French Land Register data, which excludes lakes, ponds, glaciers > 1 km^{2} (0.386 sq mi or 247 acres) and river estuaries.

Saint-Gildas-de-Rhuys (Breton: Lokentaz) is a commune in the Morbihan department of Brittany in north-western France. Inhabitants of Saint-Gildas-de-Rhuys are called in French Gildasiens.

Its French name refers to Saint Gildas, who founded the abbey of Saint-Gildas-de-Rhuys on the Rhuys Peninsula in the 6th century. From 920 to 1008, the Norman raids forced the monks to bring the relics of the saint to the abbey of Saint-Gildas of Châteauroux that they founded under the protection of the prince Ebbes of Déols.

== Population ==
Historical population
| Year | Pop. | ±% p.a. |
|---|---|---|
| 1968 | 911 | — |
| 1975 | 980 | +1.05% |
| 1982 | 1,035 | +0.78% |
| 1990 | 1,141 | +1.23% |
| 1999 | 1,436 | +2.59% |
| 2007 | 1,625 | +1.56% |
| 2012 | 1,676 | +0.62% |
| 2017 | 1,576 | −1.22% |
| 2023 | 2,004 | +4.09% |
Source: INSEE

== Burials ==
- Saint Gildas (d.570)
- Saint Felix of Rhuys (d.1038)
- Saint Goustan (also called Saint Gulstan, d.1040)
- Alienor de Bretagne, daughter of John I, Duke of Brittany (d.1249)
- Jeanne de Bretagne, daughter of John IV, Duke of Brittany (d.1388)

== See also ==
- Communes of the Morbihan department
