= Northern Counties =

Northern Counties may refer to:

- Northern Counties Committee (1903-1949), a railway company of Northeast Ireland
- Northern Counties East Football League, an English association football league
- Northern Counties Motor & Engineering Company, a former English bus-manufacturer

== See also ==
- County
