= Plou =

Plou is a Breton-language toponym meaning 'community' or 'parish' (from the Latin 'plebs').

Plou may also refer to the following places:

- Plou, Aragon, Spain, a municipality
- Plou, Cher, France, a commune
