= Rhuys Peninsula =

Coordinates: 47°31′N 2°47′W

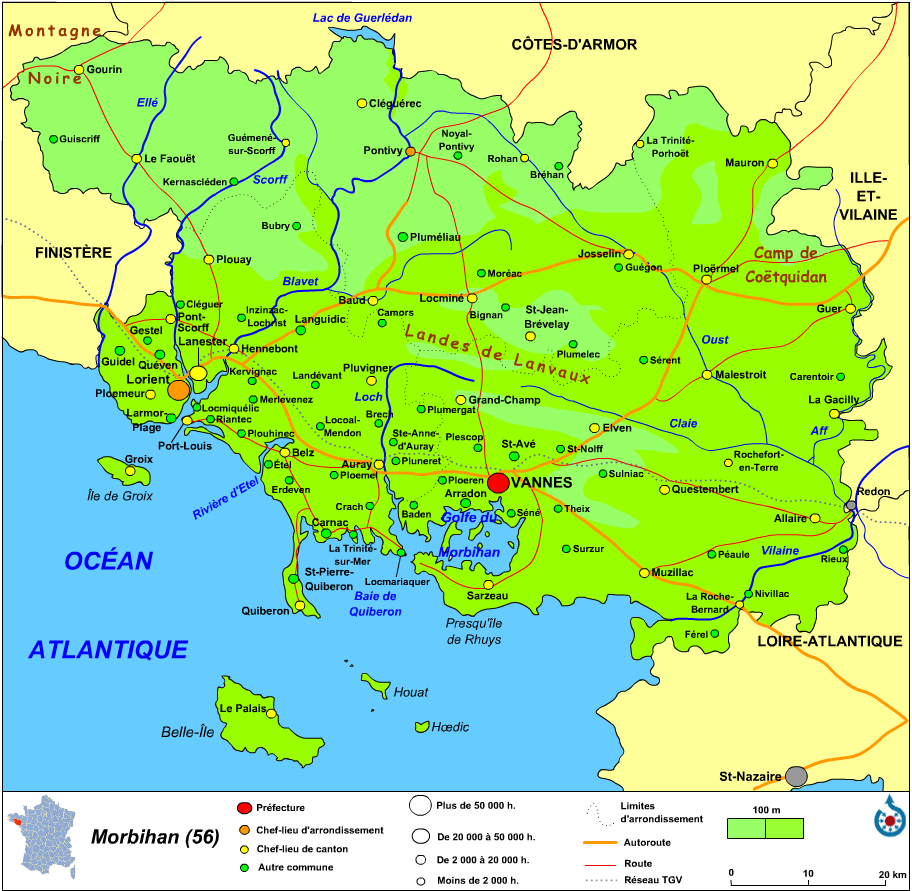
The Rhuys Peninsula forms the southern boundary coast of the Gulf of Morbihan.

The Rhuys Peninsula (Breton: Gourenez Rewiz, French: Presqu'île de Rhuys) is located in the département of Morbihan in the region of Brittany in northwestern France.

Three communes are located on the peninsula:

- Sarzeau, the largest, covering 50% of the area of the peninsula
- Arzon
- Saint-Gildas-de-Rhuys

History

- Cairn of Petit Mont
