= Tremorus of Brittany =

Saint Tremorus
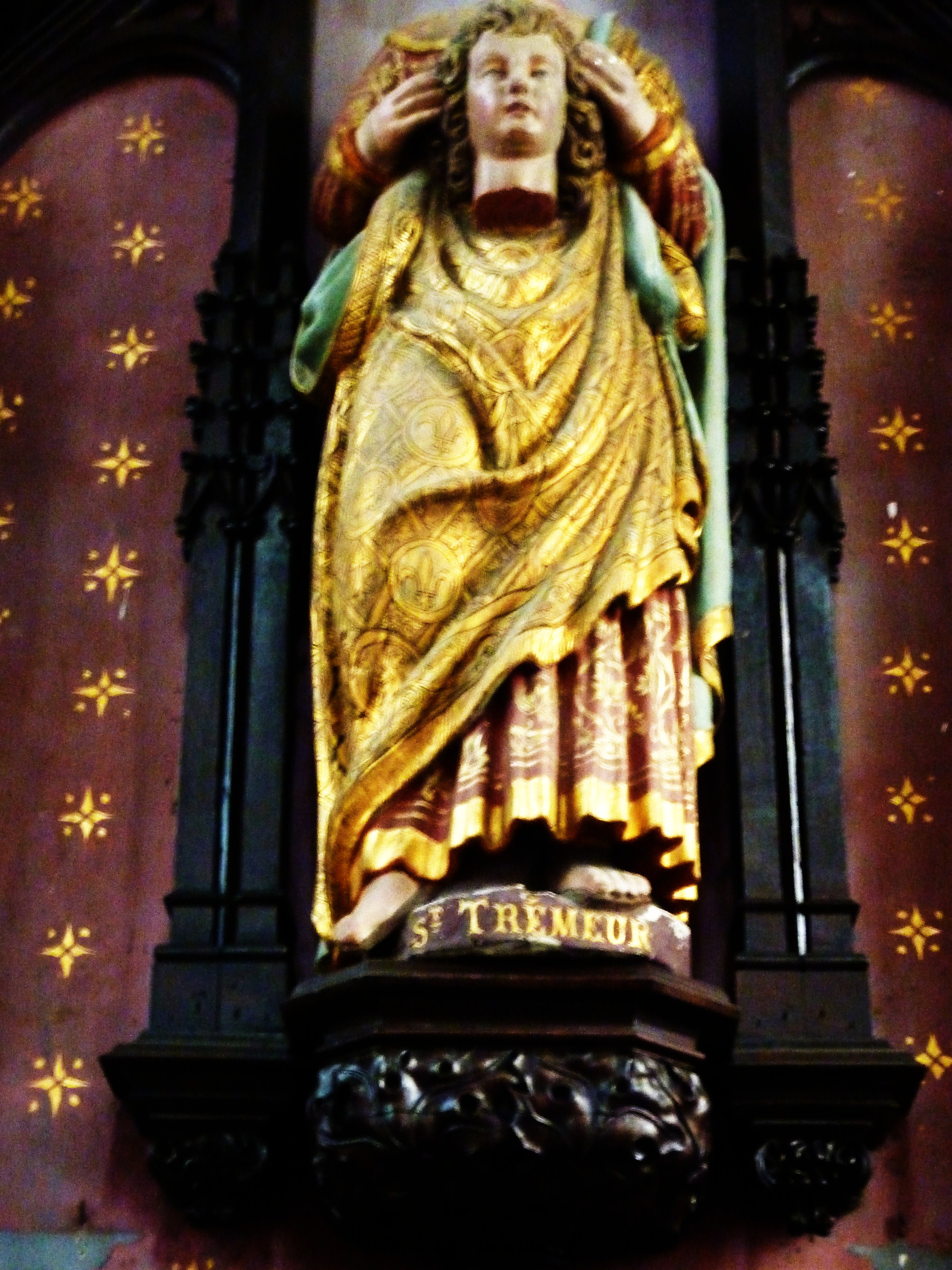
- Born: sixth century Armorica
- Died: sixth century Armorica
- Venerated in: Roman Catholic Church
- Feast: 7 November

Tremorus of Brittany, also known as Trémeur, Treveur, and Tromeur, is a sixth-century child martyr venerated by the Roman Catholic Church. He was baptized by his mother against his stepfather's wishes. His baptismal name was Gildas, after Gildas the Wise, and given the title Trech-meur ("great victory" in Breton) to distinguish him from the older Gildas. He was murdered by his stepfather Count Conmore while being educated at a monastery in Carhaix, Brittany. Conmore killed the boy because he hated Christianity. He was the son of Triphina (Triphena), who retired to a convent after her son's murder, and was taught by Gildas the Wise.
