= Waroch II =

Breton ruler of the Vannetais

Waroch (Breton: Gwereg) was an early Breton ruler of the Vannetais (Gwened).

Waroch, or his grandfather Waroch I, gave his name to the traditional Breton province of Bro-Waroch ("land of Waroch"). However, it is possible that there were several successive local leaders with this name. He is called "Waroch II" to distinguish him from a hypothetical earlier ruler, Waroch I.

In 578, the Frankish king Chilperic I sent an army to fight Waroch along the Vilaine. The Frankish army consisted of units from Poitou, Touraine, Anjou, Maine and Bayeux. The Baiocassenses "men from Bayeux" were Saxons and they in particular were routed by the Bretons. The armies fought for three days before Waroch submitted, did homage for Vannes, sent his son as a hostage, and agreed to pay an annual tribute. He subsequently broke his oath, but Chilperic's dominion over the Bretons was relatively secure as evidenced by Venantius Fortunatus' celebration of it in a poem.

In 587, Guntram compelled obedience from Waroch. He forced the renewal of the oath of 578 in writing and demanded 1,000 solidi in compensation for raiding the Nantais. In 588 the compensation was not yet paid as Waroch promised it to both Guntram and Chlothar II, who probably had suzerainty over Vannes.

In 589 or 590, Guntram sent an expedition against Waroch under Beppolem and Ebrachain, mutual enemies. Ebrachain was also the enemy of Fredegund, queen consort to Chilperic, who sent the Saxons of Bayeux to aid Waroch. Beppolem fought alone for three days before dying, at which point Waroch tried to flee to the Channel Islands, but Ebrachain destroyed his ships and forced him to accept a peace, the renewal of the oath, and the giving up of a nephew as a hostage. This was all to no effect. The Bretons maintained their independent-mindedness.

== Works cited ==
- Howorth, Henry H. "The Ethnology of Germany. Part 3: The Migration of the Saxons." The Journal of the Anthropological Institute of Great Britain and Ireland, Vol. 7. (1878), pp 293–320.
- Gregory of Tours. The History of the Franks, Volume II: Text. trans. O. M. Dalton. Clarendon Press: 1967.
