= Gildas =

British monk and saint (c. 450/500 – c. 570)

Saint Gildas
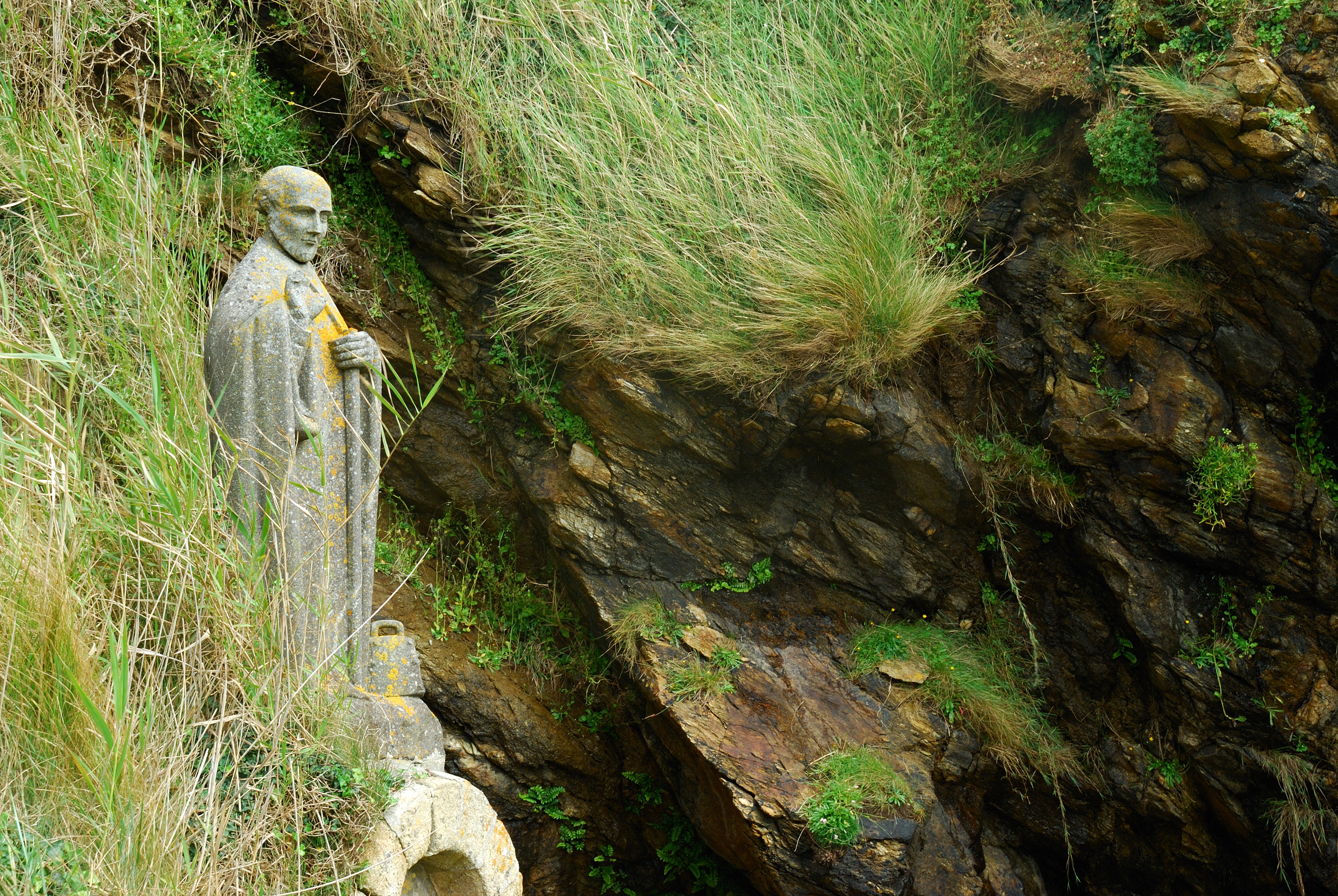
- Statue of Saint Gildas near the village of Saint-Gildas-de-Rhuys (Brittany).

Abbot
- Born: c. 450–500 "Arecluta", possibly Arclid
- Died: 570 (traditional); Rhuys, Brittany
- Venerated in: Eastern Orthodox Church; Roman Catholic Church; Anglican Communion
- Major shrine: Glastonbury Abbey (destroyed); Rhuys Church
- Feast: 29 January
- Attributes: Monk holding a Celtic bell or writing in a book
- Patronage: Welsh historians; bell founders

Gildas (English pronunciation: /ˈɡɪldəs/, Breton: Gweltaz; c. 450/500 – c. 570) (Note: The composition of De excidio has been dated to between 479 and 484 by Nick Higham, and between 515 and 530 by Thomas D. Sullivan. This gives a birth date for Gildas around the middle of the fifth century. However, David Dumville places it later at c. 500.) (Note: The date of Gildas death is taken from the Annales Cambriae, this is regarded by François Kerlouégan "as, at best, traditional".) – also known as Gildas Badonicus, Gildas fab Caw (in Middle Welsh texts and antiquarian works) and Gildas Sapiens (Gildas the Wise) – was a 6th-century British monk best known for his religious polemic De Excidio et Conquestu Britanniae, which recounts the history of the Britons before and during the coming of the Saxons. He is one of the best-documented figures of the Christian church in the British Isles during the sub-Roman period, and was renowned for his Biblical knowledge and literary style. In his later life, he emigrated to Brittany, where he founded a monastery known as Saint-Gildas-de-Rhuys.

== Hagiography ==
=== Birthplace ===
Differing versions of the Life of Saint Gildas exist, but both agree that he was born at a place called Arecluta which is described by the author as taking its name from a "certain river called the Clut, by which that district is, for the most part, watered". This was long taken by historians to mean that Gildas was born in what is now Scotland on the banks of the River Clyde.

He is now thought by some historians to have his origins farther south. Their belief is that his writing suggests a lack of familiarity with the geography of Strathclyde, but is more accurate regarding southern Britain. Furthermore, Gildas shows a familiarity with classical Latin texts that historians such as Nick Higham and E.A. Thompson view as more likely to have been acquired further south, within the bounds of former Roman Britain. Thompson suggested Chester as a possible birthplace, while the linguist Andrew Breeze suggests Arclid, near Sandbach in Cheshire, based on its plausible derivation from Arecluta.

=== Life ===
In his own work, he claims to have been born the same year as the Battle of Mount Badon. He was educated at a monastic centre, the College of St. Illtud, where he chose to forsake his royal heritage and embrace monasticism. He became a renowned teacher, converting many to Christianity and founding numerous churches and monasteries throughout Britain and Ireland. He is thought to have made a pilgrimage to Rome before immigrating to Brittany, where he took on the life of a hermit. However, his life of solitude was short-lived, and pupils soon sought him out and begged him to teach them. He eventually founded a monastery for these students at Saint-Gildas-de-Rhuys in Brittany, where he wrote De Excidio Britanniae, criticising British rulers and exhorting them to put off their sins and embrace true Christian faith. He is thought to have died at Rhuys and was buried there.

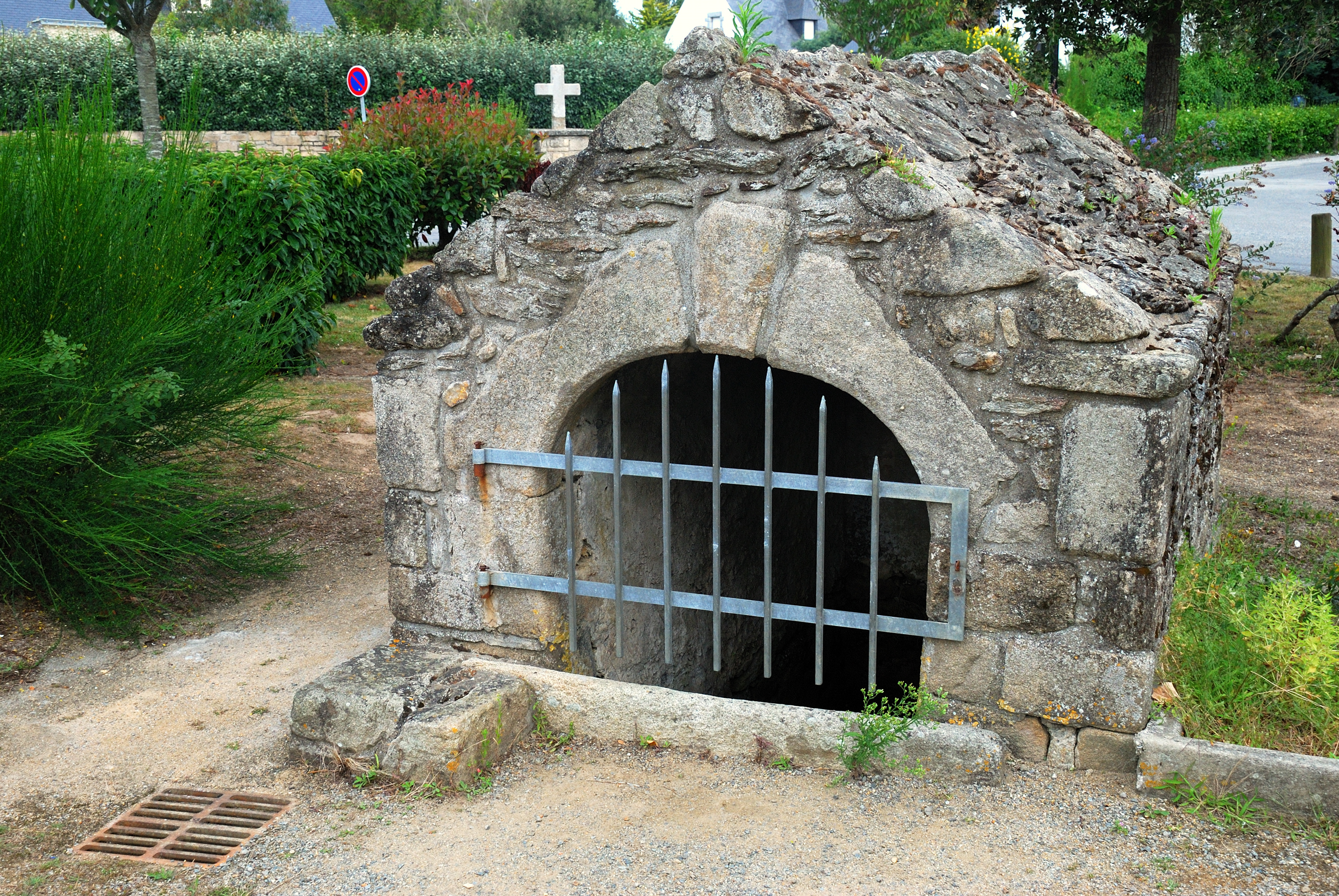
The spring of St Gildas in Saint-Gildas-de-Rhuys, Morbihan

=== Biographies ===
The First Life of Gildas was written in the 11th century by an unnamed monk at the monastery which Gildas founded in Rhuys, Brittany. According to this tradition, Gildas is the son of Caunus, king of Alt Clud in the Hen Ogledd, the Brythonic-speaking region of northern Britain. He had four brothers; his brother Cuillum ascended to the throne on the death of his father, and the rest became monks. Gildas was sent as a child to the College of St. Illtud in Glamorgan, under the care of St Illtud, and was a companion of St Samson of Dol and St Paul Aurelian. His master Illtud loved him tenderly and taught him with special zeal. He was supposed to be educated in liberal arts and divine scripture, but elected to study only holy doctrine, and to forsake his noble birth in favour of a religious life.

After completing his studies under Illtud, Gildas went to Ireland where he was ordained as a priest. He returned to his native lands in northern Britain where he acted as a missionary, preaching to the pagan people and converting many of them to Christianity. He was then asked by Ainmericus, high king of Ireland (Ainmuire mac Sétnai, 566–569), to restore order to the church in Ireland, which had altogether lost the Christian faith. Gildas obeyed the king's summons and travelled all over the island, converting the inhabitants, building churches, and establishing monasteries. He then travelled to Rome and Ravenna where he performed many miracles, including slaying a dragon while in Rome. Intending to return to Britain, he instead settled on the Isle of Houat off Brittany where he led a solitary, austere life. At around this time, he also preached to Nonnita (Non), the mother of Saint David, while she was pregnant with the saint. He was eventually sought out by those who wished to study under him, and was entreated to establish a monastery in Brittany, which he did at a place now known as Saint-Gildas-de-Rhuys.

The second "Life" of Gildas was written by Caradoc of Llancarfan, a friend of Geoffrey of Monmouth and his Norman patrons. This is an entirely fictional account intended to associate Gildas with Glastonbury Abbey. It also associates him with King Arthur. Arthur kills Gildas's brother Hueil, which causes enmity between them for a time. Hueil's enmity with Arthur is also mentioned in the Welsh prose tale Culhwch and Olwen, written around 1100. A tradition in north Wales places Hueil's execution at Ruthin, and the supposed execution stone, Maen Huail, is preserved in the town square. The Llancarfan life also contains the earliest surviving appearance of the abduction of the Guinevere episode, common in later Arthurian literature. Gildas secures the release of Guinevere after she had been abducted by Melvas, king of the "Summer Country", preventing war between him and Arthur.

== De Excidio et Conquestu Britanniae ==
Gildas is best known for his polemic De Excidio et Conquestu Britanniae, which recounts the sub-Roman history of Britain, and which is the only substantial source for history of this period written by a near-contemporary, although it is not intended to be an objective chronicle.

The work is a sermon in three parts condemning the acts of his contemporaries, both secular and religious. The first part consists of Gildas' explanation for his work and a brief narrative of Roman Britain from its conquest under the Principate to Gildas' time. He describes the doings of the Romans and the Groans of the Britons, in which the Britons make one last request for military aid from the departed Roman military. He excoriates his fellow Britons for their sins, while at the same time lauding heroes such as Ambrosius Aurelianus, whom he is the first to describe as a leader of the resistance to the Saxons. He mentions the victory at the Battle of Mons Badonicus, a feat attributed to King Arthur in later texts, though Gildas does not mention who led the battle.

Part two consists of a condemnation of five British kings, Constantine, Aurelius Conanus, Vortiporius, Cuneglasus, and Maelgwn. As it is the only contemporary information about them, it is of particular interest to scholars of British history. Part three is a similar attack on the clergy of the time.

David Dumville has severely criticised Mommsen's critical edition of 1894, but it is still preferred by the scholar Michael Winterbottom as the basis for his translation pending a new analysis.

De Excidio was usually dated to the 540s, but the historian Guy Halsall inclines to an "early Gildas" c. 490. Cambridge historian Karen George offered a date range of c. 510–530 AD. Gildas states that he was 44 when he wrote the work.

== Veneration ==
Gildas' relics were venerated in the abbey which he founded in Rhuys, until the 10th century, when they were removed to Berry. In the 18th century, they were said to be moved to the cathedral at Vannes and then hidden during the French Revolution. The various relics survived the revolution and have all since been returned to Saint-Gildas-de-Rhuys where they are visible at various times of the year at a dedicated "treasury" in the village. The body of Saint Gildas (minus the pieces incorporated into various reliquaries) is buried behind the altar in the church of Saint Gildas de Rhuys.

The gold and silver covered relics of Saint Gildas include:

- A reliquary head containing parts of the saint's skull
- An arm reliquary containing bone pieces, topped with a blessing hand
- A reliquary femur and knee

The embroidered mitre supposedly worn by Gildas is also kept with these relics. Gildas is the patron saint of several churches and monasteries in Brittany, and his feast day is celebrated on 29 January.

=== Further traditions ===
Gildas is credited with a hymn called the Lorica, or Breastplate, a prayer for deliverance from evil, which contains specimens of Hiberno-Latin. A proverb is also attributed to Gildas mab y Gaw in the Englynion y Clyweid in Llanstephan MS. 27.

In Bonedd y Saint, Gildas is recorded as having three sons and a daughter. Gwynnog ap Gildas and Noethon ap Gildas are named in the earliest tracts, together with their sister Dolgar. Another son, Tydech, is named in a later document. Iolo Morganwg adds Saint Cenydd to the list.

The scholar David Dumville suggests that Gildas was the teacher of Finnian of Moville, who in turn was the teacher of St Columba of Iona.

== See also ==
- Gildas the Albanian
- Procopius

== Bibliography ==
- Dark, Ken (2000). Britain and the End of the Roman Empire. Stroud, UK: Tempus Publishing. ISBN 978 0 7524 2532 0.
- Dumville, David N. (1984). "The Chronology of De Excidio Britanniae, Book 1". In Dumville, David; Lapidge, Michael (eds.). Gildas: New Approaches. Martlesham: Boydell Press. ISBN 978-0-85115-403-9.
- Higham, N. J. (1994). English Conquest: Gildas and Britain in the fifth century. Manchester: Manchester United Press. ISBN 978-0-7190-4080-1.
- Kerlouégan, François (2007). "Gildas [St Gildas] (fl. 5th–6th cent.)". Oxford Dictionary of National Biography. Oxford University Press. doi:10.1093/ref:odnb/10718. (subscription, Wikipedia Library access or UK public library membership required)
- Sullivan, Thomas D. (1978). De excidio of Gildas: its authenticity and date. New York: Brill. ISBN 978-90-04-05793-7.
- Williams, Ann (1991). "Gildas author fl. mid-sixth century". In Williams, Ann; Smyth, Alfred P.; Kirby, D. P. (eds.). A Biographical Dictionary of Dark Age Britain. Seaby. ISBN 978-1-85264-047-7.
