= Pierre-René Rogue =

Blessed Pierre-René Rogue C.M.

Priest
- Born: 11 June 1758; Vannes, Morbihan, Kingdom of France
- Died: 3 March 1796 (aged 37); Vannes, Morbihan, French First Republic
- Resting place: Vannes Cathedral, France
- Venerated in: Roman Catholic Church
- Beatified: 10 May 1934, Saint Peter's Basilica, Vatican City by Pope Pius XI
- Feast: 3 March; 8 May (former)
- Attributes: Palm
- Patronage: Vannes; Persecuted Christians

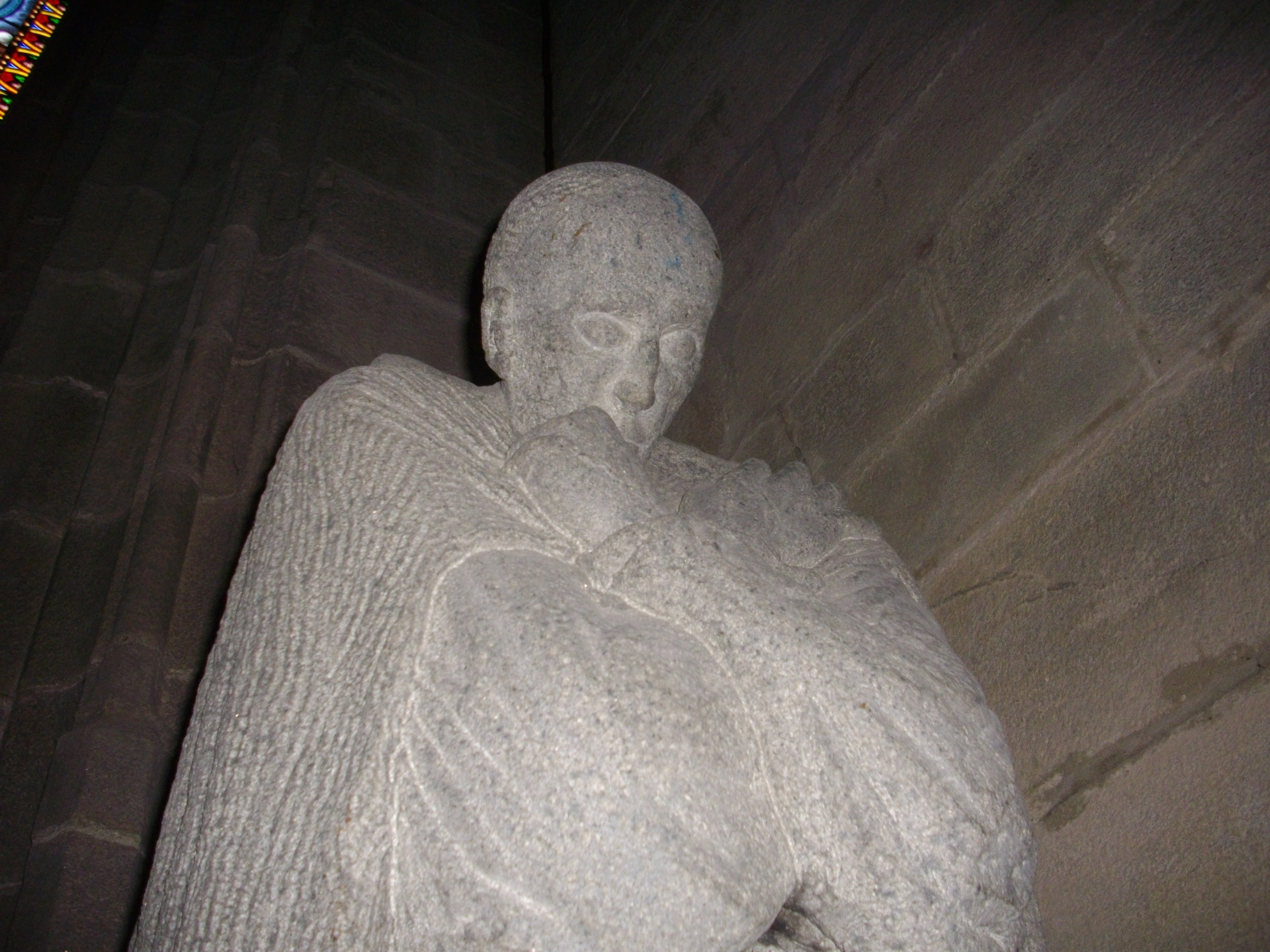
Saint Peter cathedral of Vannes (Morbihan, France) : granite statue of Pierre-René Rogue by Salomon Boisecq

Pierre-René Rogue, CM (11 June 1758 – 3 March 1796) was a French Catholic priest in the Congregation of the Mission who served in Vannes and was known for his devotion to the faith. He was killed after he refused to take the oath of allegiance to the revolutionary French government. The townsfolk of Vannes nicknamed him "the wee priest" due to his short stature. He was beatified in 1934.

== Life ==
Pierre-René Rogue on 11 June 1758 as the sole child to Claudio Rogue (d. c. 1758)his sea (d. 18i2). His mother nicknamed him as "Renotte". He was born at the same time his father was absent on a business trip and died before he could return home. Rogue was baptized on 12 June and suffered from six bouts of pneumonia before the age of twelve.

After he completed his studies at the age of seventeen in Saint-Yves college in 1775 he moved to Bourges with maternal relatives and then returned home before he decided to commence his studies for the priesthood. He commenced his studies in 1776. The Congregation of the Mission staffed it and oversaw the education of the prospective priests. He received tonsure and the minor orders in 1779 while receiving the subdiaconate in 1780 and the diaconate in 1781. Rogue received his ordination on 21 September 1782 from the Bishop of Vannes Sébastien-Michel Amelot. He celebrated his first Mass the following 22 September. Rogue entered the Vincentians and after he spent time at the Paris mother-house was professed as a member on 25 October 1786. He became a professor of theological studies in 1787.

The French Revolution saw the overthrow of King Louis XVI and the Kingdom of France after its outbreak in 1789. The oath of allegiance that the new government proposed caused consternation for the Catholic Church for it required priests to pledge themselves to the government rather than to the church itself. Rogue was one of the priests who rallied in 1791 to the call of Pope Pius VI to refuse the oath despite Bishop Amelot fleeing to Switzerland. Monsignor Le Masne – Amelot's successor – was appointed on 27 March 1791 but dispersed seminaries in the area and fled to Spain despite high hopes he would promote the call of the pope. The parish he exercised his duties in was abolished on 30 April 1791.

It was around this time he sought refuge with his mother on 2 January 1792 though soon fled and continued moving from place to place while changing clothes to continue his pastoral mission without being noticed. His mother's home was monitored at all times in order to see if Rogue would return so that the authorities could arrest him. His refusal to take the oath came on 14 August 1792 and Rogue went unnoticed for the most part during the Terror. Vannes authorities granted a full pardon to all priests who hid after refusing to take the oath in March 1795. This also halted the monitoring of his mother's home. It also allowed him to resume his pastoral duties.

A man named Le Meut who found work due to Rogue's mother – and still received financial aid from her – alerted the authorities to Rogue and his "opposition" to the new French government which would result in Rogue's arrest. On the evening of 24 December 1795 he went to give the Viaticum to a sick man but was arrested and jailed in Vannes. He comforted other inmates and fellow jailed priests for two months.

His first interrogation was held on 29 February 1796 despite the reluctance of officials who did not want to interrogate nor list him in a future trial. Rogue's mother was present at the tribunal of 2 March 1796 that condemned him to death while a citizen said to her: "You reared a monster!" upon her responding to his question of whether or not the priest was her son. The trial was conducted in the church that Rogue was ordained in.

On 3 March 1796 at 3:00pm he and another priest were led out of the prison with their collars cut and their hair shaved from the neck with their hands tied behind their back. The pair were to be taken to the guillotine in the market square and he sang a song he wrote in prison on the path to the scaffold. He arrived at the scaffolding and noticed Le Meut there and so gave him his watch. The executioner was in fact one of Rogue's former pupils and was unsure of what he should do – but he nevertheless followed his orders. After he died a soldier present said: "He was not a man: he was an angel!" His mother was present at his death. Believers rushed to the guillotine to collect his blood on cloth brought forward. He was exhumed in 1934 and reinterred under the altar of the Vannes Cathedral.

=== Appearance ===
Rogue stood at four feet ten inches tall in his lifetime. He had brown hair around a bald pate with brown brows above weak-sighted blue eyes. He also had dimpled chin with a beard.

== Beatification ==
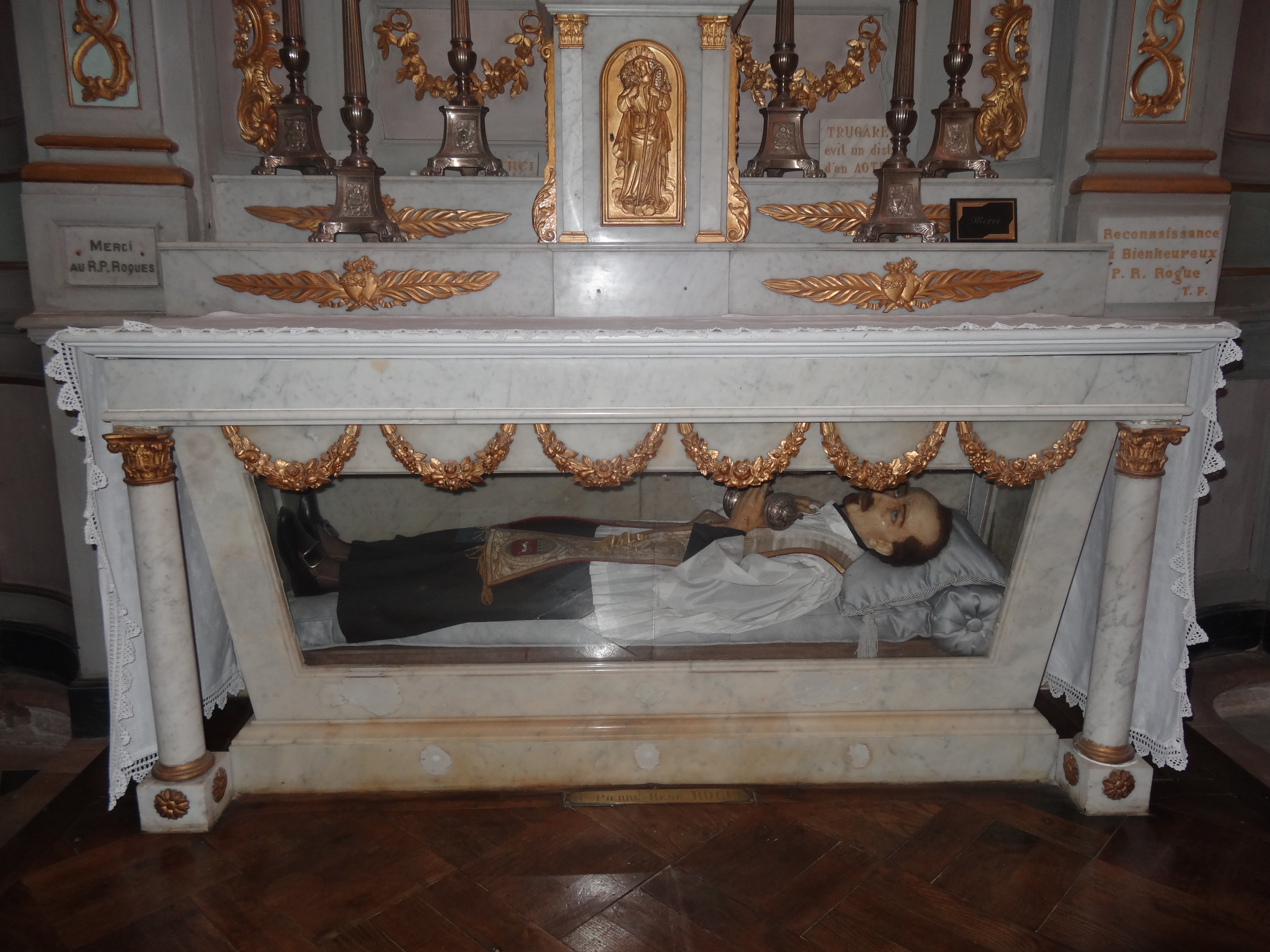
Tomb under the altar of the Vannes Cathedral.

The beatification proceedings commenced in an informative process that started on 22 February 1908 and closed after the conclusion of its business on 9 January 1912. The process was tasked with collecting available evidence on Rogue's life and attesting to his potential saintliness. The process was conducted in the Diocese of Vannes where Rogue lived and worked.

Theologians garnered all of his writings and issued their approval in a decree dated 22 March 1922. The role of the theologians was to compile a dossier on all of his letters and other writings in order to ascertain whether or not such texts remained inline with the magisterium of the Roman Catholic Church. The approval of Rogue's works allowed for the cause to continue to the next stage despite the fact that an apostolic process was dispensed.

These processes occurred despite the fact that the formal introduction of the cause did not come until 12 June 1929 in a move that bestowed the title of Servant of God on the late priest.

The processes that had occurred were ratified before it could proceed to the Congregation of Rites for further assessments and received the approval of the historical commission on 1 June 1933 in a move that clarified no obstacles existed to the cause. Pope Pius XI approved the beatification of Rogue on 22 April 1934 and beatified him on 10 May 1934 in Saint Peter's Basilica.
