= Veliki Lipovec, Žužemberk =

Veliki Lipovec
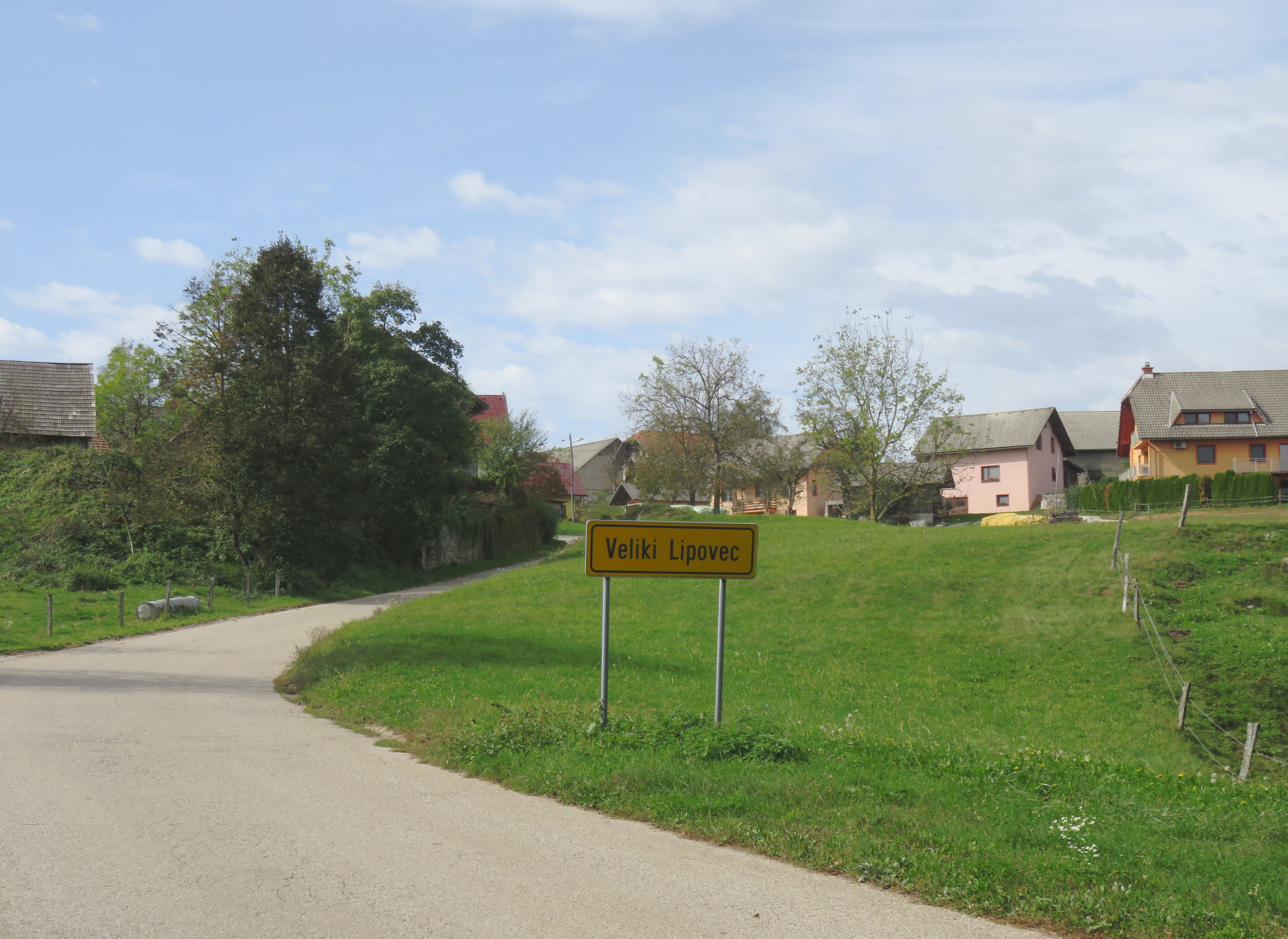

- Location in Slovenia
- Coordinates: 45°48′25.81″N 15°1′33.52″E
- Country: Slovenia
- Traditional region: Lower Carniola
- Statistical region: Southeast Slovenia
- Municipality: Žužemberk

Area
  - Total: 5.45 km^{2} (2.10 sq mi)
- Elevation: 456.5 m (1,498 ft)

Population (2002)
  - Total: 103

Veliki Lipovec (pronounced [ˈʋeːliki ˈliːpɔʋəts]) is a village in the Municipality of Žužemberk in southeastern Slovenia. The area is part of the historical region of Lower Carniola and is now included in the Southeast Slovenia Statistical Region.

== Notable people ==
Notable people that were born or lived in Veliki Lipovec include:

- Janez Frančišek Gnidovec (1873–1939), bishop of Skopje
