= Janez Frančišek Gnidovec =

Slovenian Roman Catholic bishop

Venerable Janez Frančišek Gnidovec CM
- Bishop of Skopje
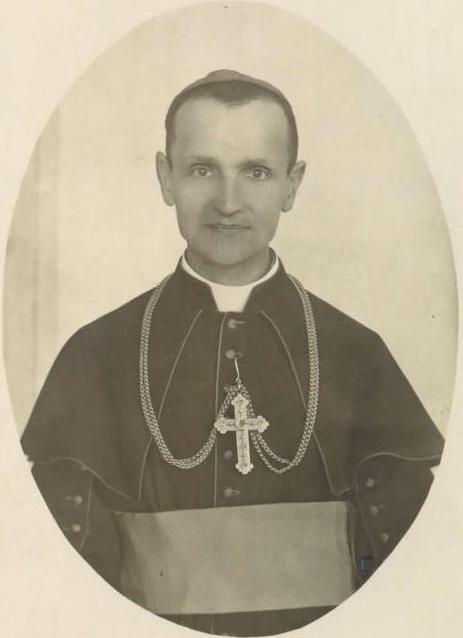
- Gnidovec around 1900
- Church: Roman Catholic Church
- Diocese: Skopje
- See: Skopje
- Appointed: 29 October 1924
- Term ended: 3 February 1939

Orders
- Ordination: 23 June 1896
- Consecration: 30 November 1924 by Ermenegildo Pellegrinetti
- Rank: Bishop

Personal details
- Born: Janez Frančišek Gnidovec; 29 September 1873 Veliki Lipovec, Žužemberk, Slovenia
- Died: 3 February 1939 (aged 65) Ljubljana, Slovenia
- Buried: Church of the Sacred Heart, Ljubljana
- Motto: I became all things to all men

Janez Frančišek Gnidovec, C.M. (29 September 1873 – 3 February 1939), was a Slovenian Roman Catholic bishop who served as the Bishop of Skopje. Gnidovec served as a pastor during World War I as a teacher and was appointed a bishop during a period of tension between Christianity and other faiths. His strong ecumenical communication skills dissipated tension and gained him both praise and recognition.

Gnidovec was also a member of the Congregation of the Mission, which he joined in 1919.

His cause of canonization commenced on 15 December 1977 under Pope Paul VI, and he was given the title Servant of God when the cause moved to the diocesan level. Pope Benedict XVI declared him Venerable on 27 March 2010.

== Early life ==
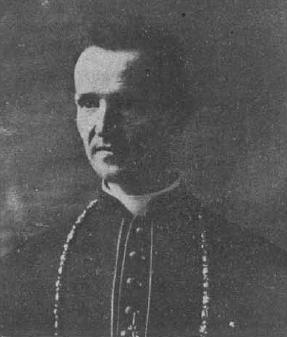
Gnidovec c. 1927

Janez Frančišek Gnidovec was born on 29 September 1873 in Slovenia into a poor farming household to devout parents in the village of Veliki Lipovec. He was baptized on 30 September that year. As a child, Gnidovec learned to recite the Angelus and to attend mass as his parents taught him. His childhood more or less ended when he was seven with the death of his mother.

He worked on the farm with his father and tended cows and pigs as part of his chores. He started attending school at age seven in Ajdovec, where the school had only one grade. He continued his schooling in Novo Mesto and was an outstanding student. He lived in Novo Mesto while he was in school, and around this time he began to tutor other students in order to both support himself and not overburden his father. He graduated from a Franciscan-run high school with honors in 1892, and this allowed him to grow in faith following their example, and he even began attending mass daily to grow in the faith. Around this same time, his father died in February 1892. It was with the death of his father that he felt the need to spiritually reflect, and he went to his local priest for advice, eventually coming to the conclusion that he was destined for Holy Orders.

Gnidovec moved to Ljubljana to enter the local seminary to begin his studies for the priesthood, where he excelled in all of his studies. He was ordained on 23 June 1896. When not in his office, he was either in the local church or out visiting the ill and the elderly. In 1899 Bishop Anton Bonaventura Jeglic dispatched him to Vienna, Austria to study languages. He balanced his graduate studies with his pastoral work by ministering to Austrian roasted chestnut sellers. He graduated in 1904.

Gnidovec taught catechism from 1904 to 1905 in Kranj, and was relieved of that duty in 1905, when he was appointed to be a teacher in a diocesan-run college, where he served as its chancellor. Gnidovec was well liked and respected due to his outstanding knowledge and his personal qualities, and both students and teachers alike looked upon him as an ideal role model.

During World War I he tended to wounded soldiers and learned to speak Hungarian so that he could tend to Hungarian soldiers. He bought the sacraments to them and tended to them with words of comfort.

Gnidovec decided to leave his position in order to enter the Congregation of the Mission - or the Vincentians - and he bid farewell to the staff and students where he was teaching on 6 December 1919. He was received and began his novitiate on 7 December 1919 where the provincial superior commented of him in a letter to the superior general: "Gnidovec is a man of best spirit, ready for every task and he is a saint according to his confreres".

== Bishop of Skopje ==
After the creation of the Kingdom of Serbs, Croats, and Slovenes in 1918, one of the most important tasks for the Catholic Church in newly formed state was reorganization of dioceses in various southern regions, liberated from Ottoman rule in 1912. In order to regulate status of Catholic Church, government of the Kingdom of Serbia previously concluded official Concordat with Holy See on 24 June 1914. By the Second Article of Concordat, it was decided that Roman Catholic Diocese of Skopje shall be reorganized as a regular bishopric, and placed under jurisdiction of Roman Catholic Archdiocese of Belgrade that was about to be created. Because of the breakout of First World War, the implementation of those provisions was postponed. Only after 1922, the question of finding a suitable candidate for the see of Skopje was initiated again.

In 1924, Gnidovec became quite apprehensive of a meeting he was to have with the Bishop of Ljubljana where he learned of his appointment as the new Roman Catholic Bishop of Skopje. Though reluctant to accept it, he did so regardless and he received his episcopal consecration on 30 November 1924. Those who knew him best were not surprised of his appointment, and vouched for him to his new diocese who knew very little of him.

His first aim as a bishop was the complete reform of all seminaries and he went back to Slovenia to meet with bishops and his congregation's provincial superior to ask for priests to which he was allowed. Religious movements were something he wished to have introduced in his new diocese and due to him, orders such as the Legion of Mary became active in the diocese; other organizations such as Catholic Action also came to prominence. Gnidovec wanted families to model themselves on that of the Holy Family and he placed a strong importance on the first Friday of each month, asking families to set them aside for worship. When travelling to parishes, he did so either via horseback or by bike or by foot. Gnidovec also understood the importance of the media in promoting the faith, and it led to the new magazine launch on 25 March 1928 of "Blagovijest" (The Good News). Another aim was to establish good ecumenical dialogue with other faiths and in particular this pertained to Islam and the Serbian Orthodox Church. Due to him relations flourished and tensions between the faiths ceased.

Falling ill in 1938 hampered his celebrating Christmas to which he did with great trouble. He went for a medical examination in January 1939 where it was discovered that he had a brain tumor, and he spent a month in hospital and was in enormous pain. He underwent such pain with great docility and offered his suffering to God. He died on Friday, 3 February 1939, the first Friday of the month. All mourned him, even the Muslims who said of him: "a saint has died".

== Beatification process ==
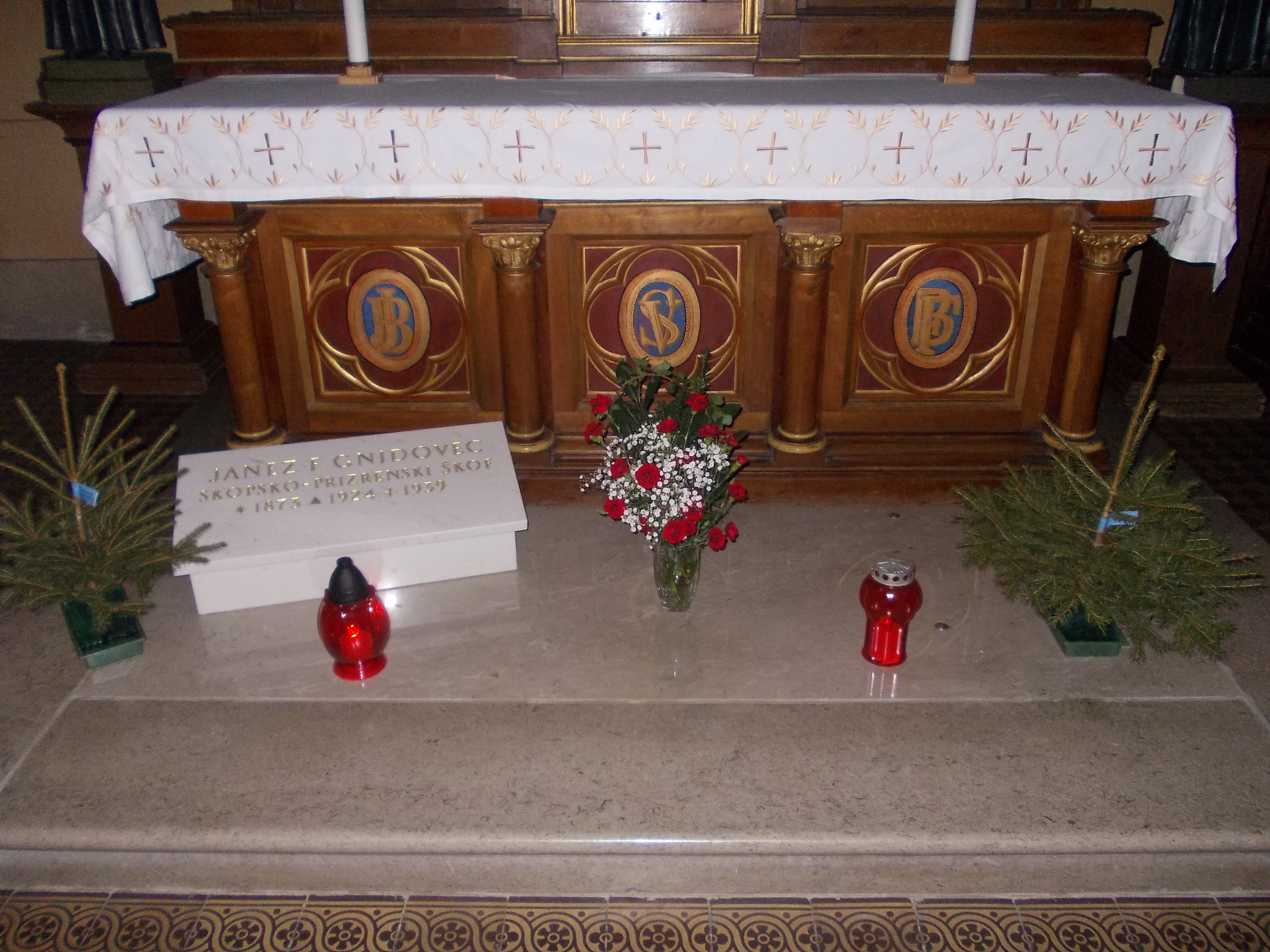
Gnidovec's tomb

The beatification process commenced in Ljubljana on 15 December 1977 in a diocesan process that accorded him the title Servant of God. It was a process long prepared for since the late bishop's diocese wanted the cause to begin at once. The process spanned from 8 February 1978 until 1984 in which witness testimonies and a great deal of documentation was collated. The Congregation for the Causes of Saints decreed the process was valid on 2 May 1986 and accepted the Positio from the postulation for further investigation in 2000.

On 27 March 2010 he was proclaimed to be Venerable after Pope Benedict XVI recognized that he had lived a life of heroic virtue in accordance with the tenets of the Christian faith.

The alleged miracle required for his beatification was investigated on a diocesan level from 13 January 2005 until 24 July 2006, and was granted the decree of validity from the Congregation on 9 June 2007. The postulation reported on 23 February 2014 that two medical experts that the Congregation appointed did not approve the miracle.

The current postulator assigned to the cause is Shijo Kanjirathamkunnel, C.M.
