= Diocese of Vannes =

Catholic diocese in France

Coordinates: 47°39′08″N 2°44′25″W

Diocese of Vannes Dioecesis Venetensis Diocèse de Vannes Eskopti Gwened

Catholic
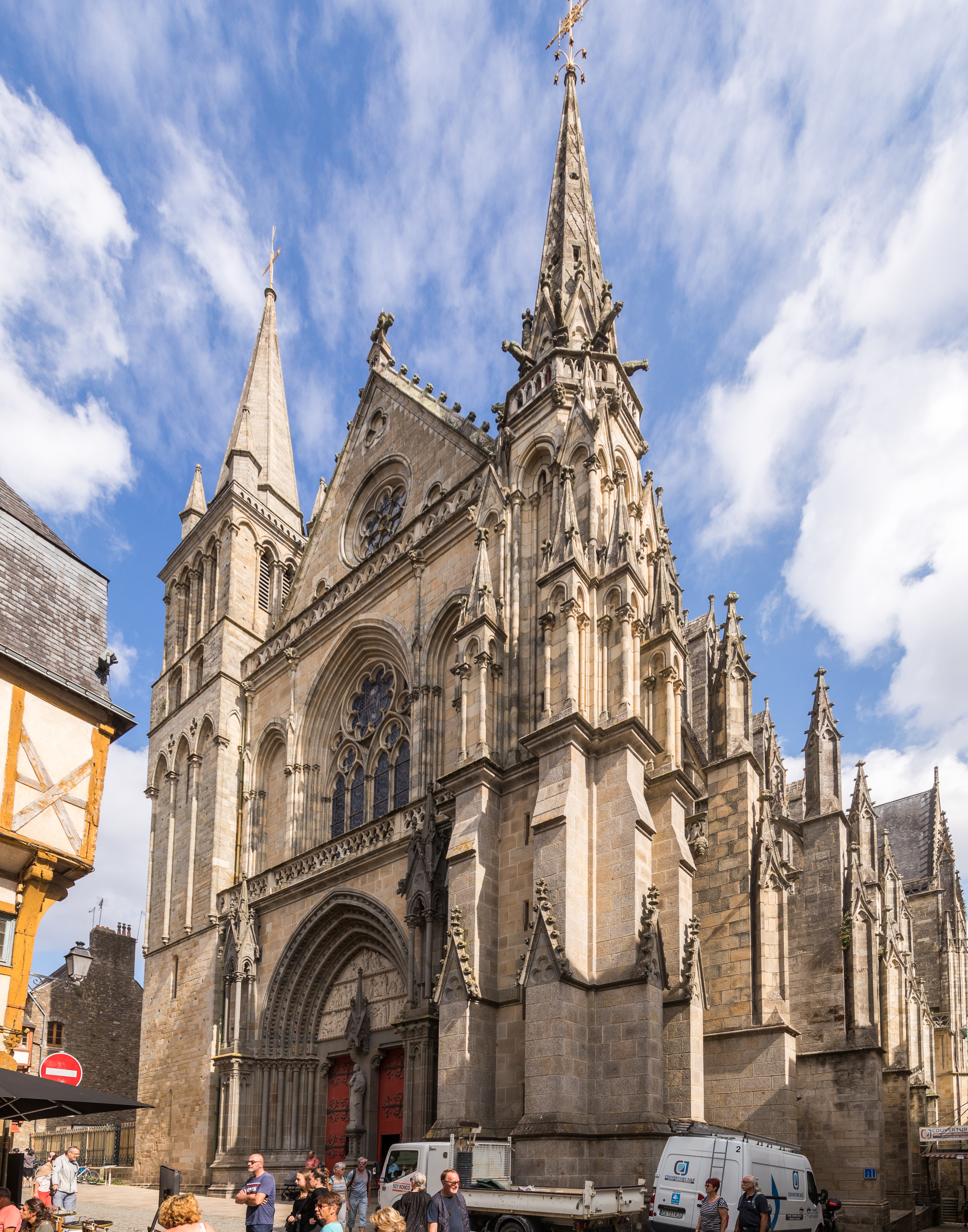
- Vannes Cathedral

Location
- Country: France
- Ecclesiastical province: Rennes
- Metropolitan: Archdiocese of Rennes, Dol, and Saint-Malo

Statistics
- Area: 7,092 km^{2} (2,738 sq mi)
- Population: Total; Catholics: (as of 2022); 751,309; 548,456 (73%)
- Parishes: 197

Information
- Denomination: Roman Catholic
- Sui iuris church: Latin Church
- Rite: Roman Rite
- Established: 5th Century
- Cathedral: Cathedral Basilica of St. Peter in Vannes
- Patron saint: St. Padarn
- Secular priests: 226 (Diocesan); 65 (Religious Orders); 61 Permanent Deacons

Current leadership
- Pope: Leo XIV
- Bishop: Raymond Centène
- Metropolitan Archbishop: Pierre d'Ornellas

Map

Website
- Website of the Diocese

The Diocese of Vannes (Latin: Dioecesis Venetensis; French: Diocèse de Vannes) is a Latin Church diocese of the Catholic Church in France. It was established in the 5th century. The seat of the bishop is Vannes Cathedral, in the city of Vannes, on the southern shore of the peninsula of Brittany (Bretagne). The diocese corresponds to the French civil department of Morbihan, and has been a suffragan to the Archdiocese of Rennes, Dol, and Saint-Malo since 3 January 1859.

Raymond Michel René Centène is the current bishop since his appointment in 2005.

In 2022, in the Diocese of Vannes there was one priest for every 1,884 Catholics.

== History ==
The ancient Gallo-Roman name for the city of Vannes (city of the Veneti) was Darioritum.

=== Sede vacante ===
Bishop Guido Conley died on 21 (or 31) October 1270. On the appointed day, seventeen dignities and canons assembled to elect his successor. Four scrutators were selected to supervise the voting. Nine voters supported Hervé, the Cantor of the cathedral Chapter; six supported Master Gaufridus, one of the canons. The stalemate was reported to the papal Curia, which was living in exile in Viterbo and engaged in the longest papal election in history, and a lawsuit was begun. A new pope was not elected until 1 September 1271, and, since he had been on crusade, he did not arrive in Viterbo until February 1272; he was crowned in Rome as Gregory X on 27 March 1272. He handed the case to Cardinal Simon Paltanieri to act as Assessor, but Gregory died on 10 January 1276 and Paltanieri not long thereafter, with the matter of the Vannes election still undecided. His successor, Pope Innocent V, died six months later. His successor, Pope Adrian V, lasted 5 weeks. His successor, Pope John XXI, appointed Cardinal Guillaume de Bray to continue the case, but John XXI reigned for only 8½ months. During his reign, one of the principals in the case, Canon Gaufridus, died. Pope John's successor, Pope Nicholas III, finally took up the case, and issued a ruling on 12 December 1279. He found the election canonical, confirmed Cantor Hervé, and consecrated him personally.

In 1642, during a pastoral visitation, Bishop Sébastien de Rosmadec (1622–1646) issued an set of statutes for the diocese. On 4 June 1648, he held a synod in Vannes.

On 22 September 1693, Bishop François d'Argouges (1687–1716) held a synod in Vannes, and issued a set of statutes.

=== Chapter and cathedral ===
The edifice of the cathedral dates from several epochs. It was vaulted in the 18th century.

From the mid-15th century, the cathedral of Saint Peter was widely famed as the resting place of the remains of S. Vincent Ferrer, O.P. Fra Vincent had spent the last two years of his life, from 1417 to 1419, in Brittany, a good part of that time in Vannes. He died there on 5 April 1419. On 3 June 1455, in a consistory of cardinals and other prelates, Pope Calixtus III pronounced Vincent Ferrer a saint, and on 29 June 1455 he held a solemn public ceremony in which the declaration of canonization was made. Cardinal Alain de Coëtivy, himself a Breton, was sent by Pope Calixtus as legate to France, and on 2–4 June 1456, he presided over the inauguration of the cult of Saint Vincent in the cathedral of Vannes.

The cathedral is staffed and administered by a corporation called the Chapter. The Chapter consisted of four dignities (the archdeacon, the treasurer, the cantor, and the scholasticus) and fourteen canons. In 1746, there were fifteen canons. The dignities and canons were named alternately by the bishop and the pope.

The diocese of Vannes had, at one time, three collegiate churches: Rochefort, founded on 1 June 1527, with a Dean, a Cantor and five canons; Guiméné, founded in 1529 with the approval of Pope Clement VII, with a Provost, six canons, and four chaplains; and Saint-Michel-du-Champ, founded in 1380, with eight canons, which was taken over by Carthusians in 1480.

In the Civil Constitution of the Clergy, the National Constituent Assembly abolished cathedral chapters, canonicates, prebends, chapters and dignities of collegiate churches, chapters of both secular and regular clergy of both sexes, and abbeys and priories whether existing under a Rule or in commendam.

The liturgical life of the cathedral was enhanced, during the Counter-Reformation, and under the influence of the Catholic League, by numerous actions and gifts which added to the solemnity and the richness of various festivals.

=== Seminary ===
The issue of a diocesan seminary, mandated by the Council of Trent was first raised at a meeting of the clergy of Vannes in 1665. The aristocratic residence of Couessial was acquired, and the seminary opened in 1680. Staff were provided by clergy of the diocese, and canons of the cathedral took a leading role. In 1702, the bishop installed the Lazarists founded 1625 by Vincent de Paul, as faculty, positions they continued to fill until 1833. Subsequently, diocesan priests again served as faculty.

The first school (collège) in Vannes began construction in 1574 near the Porte Saint-Yves, with a donation by Jean de Briçon Seigneur de Pé and his wife Anne Desprez. It received the approval of Bishop Louis de La Haye (1574–1588) on 9 December 1579. On 7 May 1629, the city entrusted the operation of the school to the Jesuits. On 2 August 1762, the Parlement of Rennes suppressed the Society of Jesus.

=== French Revolution ===
One of the first acts of the French Revolution was the abolition of feudalism and its institutions, including estates, provinces, duchies, baillies, and other obsolete organs of government.

Even before it directed its attention to the Church directly, the National Constituent Assembly attacked the institution of monasticism. On 13 February 1790. it issued a decree which stated that the government would no longer recognize solemn religious vows taken by either men or women. In consequence, Orders and Congregations which lived under a Rule were suppressed in France. Members of either sex were free to leave their monasteries or convents if they wished, and could claim an appropriate pension by applying to the local municipal authority. These decrees applied to the five monasteries of men in the diocese of Vannes (Redon, S. Gildas de Rhuis, Lanvaux Prières). Also suppressed were the six monasteries of women (including La Joie).

The Assembly ordered the replacement of political subdivisions of the ancien régime with subdivisions called "departments", to be characterized by a single administrative city in the center of a compact area. The decree was passed on 22 December 1789, the boundaries fixed on 26 February 1790, with the institution to be effective on 4 March 1790. Vannes was assigned to the Departement de Morbihan, with its administrative center at Vannes. The diocese of Saint-Malo was abolished, and the southern part of its territory assigned to Morbihan. The National Constituent Assembly then, on 6 February 1790, instructed its ecclesiastical committee to prepare a plan for the reorganization of the clergy. At the end of May, its work was presented as a draft Civil Constitution of the Clergy, which, after vigorous debate, was approved on 12 July 1790. There was to be one diocese in each department, requiring the suppression of approximately fifty dioceses. The suppression of dioceses by the state was uncanonical.

In the Civil Constitution of the Clergy, the National Constituent Assembly also abolished cathedral chapters, canonicates, prebends, chapters and dignities of collegiate churches, chapters of both secular and regular clergy of both sexes, and abbeys and priories whether existing under a Rule or in commendam.

Most of the clergy of Morbihan (Vannes) were opposed to the changes mandated by the National Assembly, and only 50 of the 500 clergy were willing to take the required oath of obedience to the Civil Constitution. They therefore faced arrest, trial, and deportation. When Bishop Amelot refused to take the oath in February 1791, he was deposed and there was a popular uprising, which was put down by the new departmental authorities. The bishop was arrested, taken to Paris, sent to prison in Vincennes, and then deported to Switzerland. On 27 March 1791, a constitutional bishop, Charles Le Masle, was elected by special revolutionary electors to replace Bishop Amelot. That act was uncanonical and schismatic. Le Masle held a synod in Vannes in 1796, in a situation in which only 20 of the parishes in the diocese had constitutional priests. He held another synod in Lorient in 1800, and resigned under pressure from Napoleon in 1801.

=== Restoration of order ===
On 29 November 1801, in the concordat of 1801 between the French Consulate, headed by First Consul Napoleon Bonaparte, and Pope Pius VII, the bishopric of Vannes and all the other dioceses in France were suppressed. This removed all the contaminations and novelties introduced by the Constitutional Church. The pope then recreated the French ecclesiastical order, in the bull "Qui Christi Domini," respecting in most ways the changes introduced during the Revolution, including the reduction in the number of archdioceses and dioceses. Vannes was made a suffragan of the archdiocese of Rennes. The territory of Vannes included part of the ancient Diocese of Saint-Malo, which was subsequently suppressed, after a three way split among the Dioceses of Vannes and Saint-Brieuc and the diocese of Rennes.

Bishop Amelot refused the pope's demand for the resignation of all the bishops of France in 1801, and therefore, when Pius VII abolished the French hierarchy in 1801, Amelot lost his see and another bishop, Antoine-Xavier Maynaud de Pancemont (1802–1807), was nominated by Napoleon and approved by Pius VII, and took Amelot's place.

By 1835, several religious orders had established themselves in the diocese of Vannes: the Hospitalières de Saint-Augustine (two houses), the Ursulines (3 houses), the Dames de la Charité de Saint-Louis (3 houses), the Soeurs de Saint-Esprit (3 houses), and the Soeurs de Saint-Vincent-de-Paul (2 houses).

=== In fiction ===
Alexandre Dumas, père, in The Vicomte of Bragelonne: Ten Years Later, the last book of his d'Artagnan Romances. makes the former musketeer Aramis the bishop of the Diocese of Vannes, on the nomination of Nicolas Fouquet, the Superintendent of Finances of King Louis XIV from 1653 to 1661.

== See also ==
- List of Catholic dioceses in France

== Bishops of Vannes ==
=== To 1000 ===
- (attested 453) : [Ignotus]
- (attested c. 465) : Paternus
- (attested 511) : Modestus
- (mid 6th cent.) : Macliavus
- (attested 578/9) : Eunius
- (attested 590) : Regalis
- (mid to late 8th cent.) : Agus
- (attested 797, 814) : Isaac
- 820 : Winhaelhoc
- (attested 820) :Raginarius
- (attested 838–848) Susannus
- (attested 850–868) : Courantgen
- (attested 870) : Dilis
- (attested 878–888) : Kenmonoc
- (attested 891–908) : Bili
- ( ? – ?) : Cunadan
- (attested 945–950) : Blenlivet
- ( ? – ?) : ? Alveus
- (attested 970) : Auriscanus

=== 1000 to 1378 ===
- (attested 1008) : Judicael
- 1037–1065? : Budic
- (attested 1066–1082) : Maingui
- (attested 1089–1128) : Morvan(us)
- 1128–1132 : Jacobus
- 1132?–1143 : Even
- 1143–1177 : Rouaud, O.Cist.
- 1177 : Geoffroy

1177–1182 : Sede vacante

- 1182–1220? : Guethenoc
- 1220–1232 : Robertus
- 1232 : Guilelmus
- 1232–1254 : Cadiocus
- ( 1254 ) : Guillelmus de Quelenec
- 1255–1262 : Alanus
- 1265–1270 : Guido Conley

1270–1279 : Sede vacante

- 1279–1287 : Hervé
- 1287–c. 1310: Henri Tors
- 1310–1312 : Yves
- 1312–1339 : Jean le Parisy
- 1339–1346 : Gaufridus de Saint-Guen
- 1347–1360 : Gualterus de S. Paterno
- 1360–1378 : Gaufridus de Rohan

=== From 1378 to 1600 ===
- 1378–1382 : Jean, Avignon Obedience
- 1382–1383 : Simon de Langres, O.P., Avignon Obedience
- 1383–1404 : Henri le Barbu, O.Cist., Avignon Obedience
- 1404–1408 : Hugues Lestoquer, O.P., Avignon Obedience
- 1409–1432 : Amaury de la Motte d'Acigné
- 1432–1451 : Jean de Leon, O.P.
- 1451–1475 : Ivo de Pontsal
- 1476–1490 : Cardinal Pierre de Foix (the Younger)
- 1490–1503 : Cardinal Lorenzo Cybo de Mari, Administrator
- 1504–1511 : Jacques II. de Beaune de Semblançay,
- 1511–1513 : Cardinal Robert Guibé
- 1514-1531 : Cardinal Lorenzo Pucci
- 1531–1544 : Cardinal Antonio Pucci
- 1544–1548 : Laurent III. Pucci
- 1550–1557 : Charles de Marillac
- 1557–1558 : Sébastien de L'Aubespine
- 1559–1566 : Philippe du Bec (also Archbishop of Reims)
- 1566–1570 : Jean Le Feuvre
- [1572–1573 : Pierre de Saint-Martin, Bishop-elect]
- 1574 : Jean de La Haye
- 1574–1588 : Louis de La Haye
- 1592–1596 : Georges d'Aradon

=== 1600 to 1800 ===
- 1599–1622 : Jacques Martin
- 1622–1646 : Sébastien de Rosmadec
- 1648–1671 : Charles de Rosmadec
- 1671–1687 : Louis Casset de Vautorte
- 1687–1716 : François d'Argouges
- 1716–1717 : Louis de La Vergne-Montenard de Tressan
- 1717–1719 : Jean-François-Paul Lefèvre de Caumartin
- 1719– 1742 : Antoine Fagon
- 1742–1746 : Jean-Joseph Chapelle de Saint-Jean de Jumilhac
- 1746–1774 : Charles-Jean de Bertin
- 1774–1801 : Sébastien-Michel Amelot

Constitutional church (schismatic)

- 1791–1801 : Charles le Masle

=== since 1800 ===
- 1802–1807 Antoine-Xavier Maynaud de Pancemont
- 1807–1817 : Pierre-François-Gabriel-Raymond-Ignace-Ferdinand de Bausset-Roquefort
- 1817–1826 : Henri-Marie-Clauce de Bruc-Montplaisir
- 1826–1827 : Simon Garnier
- 1827–1860 : Charles-Jean de la Motte de Broons et de Vauvert
- 1861–1863 : Louis-Anne Dubreil
- 1863–1865 : Jean-Baptiste Charles Gazailhan
- 1865–1897 : Jean-Marie Bécel
- 1898–1903 : Amédée-Jean-Baptiste Latieule
- 1906–1928 : Alcime-Armand-Pierre-Henri Gouraud
- 1929–1941 : Hippolyte Tréhiou
- 1941–1964 : Eugène-Joseph-Marie Le Bellec
- 1964–1991 : Pierre-Auguste-Marie Boussard
- 1991–2005 : François-Mathurin Gourvès
- 2005-pres.: Raymond Michel René Centène

== Bibliography ==
=== Reference works ===
- Gams, Pius Bonifatius (1873). Series episcoporum Ecclesiae catholicae: quotquot innotuerunt a beato Petro apostolo (in Latin). Ratisbon: Typis et Sumptibus Georgii Josephi Manz. pp. 649–650. (Use with caution; obsolete)
- Eubel, Conradus, ed. (1913). Hierarchia catholica (in Latin). Vol. 1 (second ed.). Münster: Libreria Regensbergiana. (in Latin) pp. 520.
- Eubel, Conradus, ed. (1914). Hierarchia catholica (in Latin). Vol. 2 (second ed.). Münster: Libreria Regensbergiana.. p. 264.
- Eubel, Conradus; Gulik, Guilelmus (1923). Hierarchia catholica (in Latin). Vol. 3 (second ed.). Münster: Libreria Regensbergiana. p. 329.
- Gauchat, Patritius (Patrice) (1935). Hierarchia catholica (in Latin). Vol. IV (1592-1667). Münster: Libraria Regensbergiana. pp. 362.
- Ritzler, Remigius; Sefrin, Pirminus (1952). Hierarchia catholica medii et recentis aevi (in Latin). Vol. V (1667-1730). Patavii: Messagero di S. Antonio. pp. 408.
- Ritzler, Remigius; Sefrin, Pirminus (1958). Hierarchia catholica medii et recentis aevi (in Latin). Vol. VI (1730-1799). Patavii: Messagero di S. Antonio. p. 436.

=== Studies ===
- Chadwick, Nora Kershaw (1969). Early Brittany. Cardiff: University of Wales Press. ISBN 9780900768262.
- Duchesne, Louis Fastes épiscopaux de l'ancienne Gaule: Vol. II: L'Aquitaine et les Lyonnaises. (in French). deuxième edition. Paris: Thorin & fils, 1899. pp. 375–379. Internet Archive
- Hauréau, Barthélemy (1856). Gallia Christiana: In Provincias Ecclesiasticas Distributa... De provincia Turonensi (in Latin). Vol. Tomus Quartus decimus (XIV). Paris: Typographia Regia. pp. 915–970, Instrumenta, pp. 209–224.
- Jean, Armand (1891). Les évêques et les archevêques de France depuis 1682 jusqu'à 1801 (in French). Paris: A. Picard. pp. 454–458.
- Leguay, Jean-Pierre (1988). Histoire de Vannes et de sa région (in French). Toulouse: Privat. ISBN 9782708982727.
- Le Mené, Joseph-Marie (1888). Histoire du diocèse de Vannes (in French). Vol. Tomes I et II. Vannes: E. Lafolye.
- Morice, Pierre-Hyacinthe (1742). Mémoires pour servir de preuves à l'Histoire ecclésiastique et civile de Bretagne (in French and Latin). Vol. Tome I. Paris: Charles Osmont.
- Pisani, Paul (1907). Répertoire biographique de l'épiscopat constitutionnel (1791-1802) (in French). Paris: A. Picard et fils.
- Tresvaux, François Marie (1839). L' église de Bretagne ou histoire des siéges épiscopaux, séminaires et collégiales, abbayes et autres communautés de cette province: d'après les matériaux de Dom Hyacinthe Morice de Beaubois. (in French). Paris: Mequignon, 1839. (pp. 147–190)

=== External links ===
- (in French) Centre national des Archives de l'Église de France, L’Épiscopat francais depuis 1919, retrieved: 2016-12-24.
