= François-Mathurin Gourvès =

French priest (1929–2020)

- Bishop of Vannes
- Diocese: Diocese of Vannes
- Installed: 16 November 1991
- Term ended: 16 October 2005
- Predecessor: Pierre Boussard
- Successor: Raymond Centène

Orders
- Ordination: 6 April 1953

Personal details
- Born: Mathurin Gourvès; 17 June 1929 Plougastel-Daoulas, France
- Died: 12 August 2020 (aged 91) Sainte-Anne-d'Auray, France
- Denomination: Catholic
- Coat of arms

François-Mathurin Gourvès (17 June 1929 – 12 August 2020) was a French Roman Catholic bishop. He served as Bishop of Vannes from 1991 to 2005, and was Bishop Emeritus from 2005 to 2020.

== Biography ==
Born as Mathurin Gourvès, he was the son of farmer François and Geneviève Gourvès (née Thomas). After his studies at Sciences Po, he entered the Grand Séminaire in Quimper before continuing his training at the Pontifical Gregorian University and the Institut Catholique de Paris, earning a degree in theology. He finished his studies at the Institut des sciences sociales du travail de Paris. On 6 April 1953, he was ordained as a priest in the Diocese of Quimper.

After having been a vicar in Landerneau, Gourvès became a diocesan chaplain with the Young Christian Workers from 1957 to 1967. In 1969, he was sent to the Saint-Sauveur church in Brest until 1975.

Gourvès was consecrated as Bishop of Vannes on 24 February 1991 and subsequently added François to his first name. He officially became Bishop on 16 November 1991, succeeding Pierre Boussard, the same man who had ordained him. In 1996, Bishop Gourvès joined multiple diocesan radio stations, including Radio chrétienne francophone. That same year, he was at the welcoming of Pope John Paul II, who was the first Pope to set foot in Brittany. John Paul II gave a speech in Sainte-Anne-d'Auray, the only known place where Saint Anne, grandmother of Jesus Christ, had appeared. The speech marked 27 years as Pope for John Paul II, and was one year prior to World Youth Day in France. In 2005, following the consecration of his successor, Raymond Centène, he retired to his hometown of Plougastel-Daoulas. In 2015, he moved to Sainte-Anne-d'Auray.

François-Mathurin Gourvès died on 12 August 2020 in Saint-Anne-d'Auray at the age of 91.
