= Tomaž Mavrič =

Argentine Catholic priest

Tomaž Mavrič, CM (born 9 May 1959) is an Argentine Catholic priest who has served as superior general of the Congregation of the Mission since 2016.

== Biography ==
Mavrič was born in Buenos Aires, Argentina, to Leopoldina and Joze Mavrič, both Slovenians, in 1932. They fled Yugoslavia, in May 1945, when the Communist party rose to power in the aftermath of World War II, fleeing to Austria and then, in 1948, to Argentina. They married in 1957 and had five children, two girls and three boys. Joze Mavrič died in 1989, when Tomaž was 30-years-old; two brothers still live in Argentina, a sister in the United States, and a brother in Brazil.

He attended primary and secondary education in Buenos Aires, the last three years of the first and the entire second at the Colegio Maria Reina, founded and directed by Slovenian Vincentians in Remedios de Escalada, Buenos Aires. During this time, Mavrič remained at the boarding school next to the school operated by the Vincentians.

=== Early Vincentian work ===
After finishing high school, Tomaž entered the Congregation of the Mission in Slovenia. He attended the internal seminary in Belgrade and, from 1977, began his collegiate studies in Ljubljana. In Ljubljana, Mavrič studied philosophy and theology. He took his perpetual vows at the Congregation of the Mission on 8 April 1982 and was ordained a priest on 29 June 1983 in Ljubljana. Shortly after his ordination, he was sent to Toronto, Canada, where he served as a vicar until 1994.

After his time as a vicar in Canada, Mavrič relocated again to Slovenia, working for three years in local religious missions. At that time, he was invited by Father Robert Maloney, CM, then Superior General of the Congregation of the Mission, to work in the congregation's international missions. Mavrič then joined the formation, leaving for Dublin, Ireland, and for Banska Bystrica, Slovakia, and, between 2004 and 2007, guided the novitiate in Kiev, Ukraine. In 2009, he was elected Vice-Visitor of the Province of Saints Cyril and Methodius, founded in 2001, which encompasses Belarus, Ukraine, and Russia.

On July 5, 2016, during the 42nd General Assembly of the Congregation of the Mission, held in Chicago, United States, Mavrič was elected the 25th Superior General, replacing Father Gregory Gay, CM.

=== Response to the COVID-19 pandemic ===
Mavrič claimed that the COVID-19 pandemic gave Christians the opportunity "to serve, to be better, and to grow" as members of their society. Furthermore, Mavrič cited Pope Francis in claiming "we will not leave this crisis as the same persons that we were before this happened." Finally, Mavrič praised the use of modern technology in the battle against the spread of COVID-19, pointing toward remote conferencing applications like Zoom in allowing meetings without the risk of infection.
