= François Lefebvre de Caumartin =

French bishop (1668–1733)

- Bishop of Blois
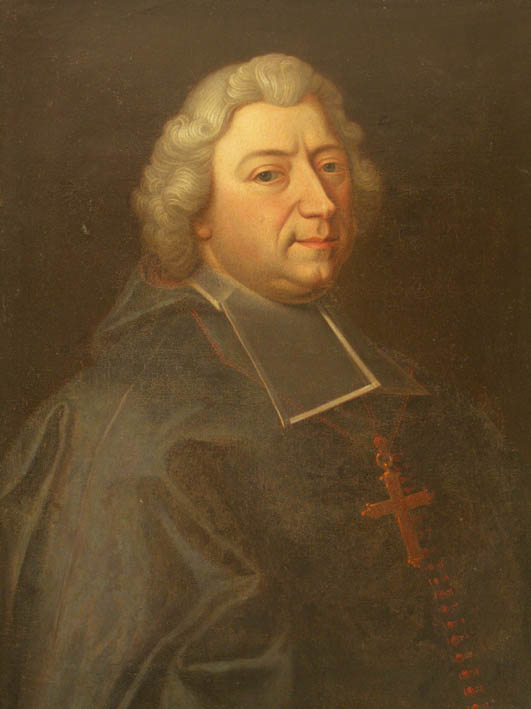
- Church: Catholic Church
- Diocese: Diocese of Blois
- In office: 4 March 1720 – 30 August 1733
- Predecessor: David Nicolas de Bertier
- Successor: François de Crussol d'Uzès
- Previous post: Bishop of Vannes (1718-1720)

Orders
- Ordination: c. 1693
- Consecration: 17 July 1718 by Vincent-François Desmarets

Personal details
- Born: 16 December 1668 Châlons sur Marne, Champagne, Kingdom of France
- Died: 30 August 1733 (aged 64) Blois, Duchy of Orléanais, Kingdom of France

François Lefebvre de Caumartin or Jean François Paul Lefèvre de Caumartin (16 December 1668 in Châlons-en-Champagne – 30 August 1733 in Blois) was a French bishop.

He was elected member of the Académie Française in 1694 and member of the Académie des inscriptions et belles-lettres in 1701.

Catholic Church titles
Preceded by Louis III de La Vergne de Tressan	Bishop of Vannes; September 1717 – August 1719	Succeeded by Antoine II Fagon
