= Oscar Lukefahr =

American Catholic priest and apologist (1939–2015)

Oscar Lukefahr, C.M. (July 20, 1939 – August 10, 2015) was an American Catholic priest, theologian, writer, and Christian apologist. He is best known as the author of many introductory books and tracts on the subject of Catholicism, operating the Catholic Home Study Service from the Archdiocese of St. Louis. This service distributes free Catholic literature to thousands of RCIA students each year.

Lukefar is the nephew of Father Oscar Huber who administered last rites to President John F. Kennedy and consoled First Lady Jackie Kennedy after the president's assassination in 1963. Lukefar followed his uncle's footsteps in becoming a Vincentian and a devout supporter of the Knights of Columbus.

== List of books by Oscar Lukefahr ==
- We Believe... A Survey Of The Catholic Faith
- We Worship—A Guide To The Catholic Mass
- The Search For Happiness
- A Catholic Guide To The Bible
- The Privilege Of Being Catholic
- The Catechism Handbook
- Christ's Mother And Ours

His publisher is currently Liguori Publications.
