= Salvatore Micalizzi =

Italian roman catholic priest

Venerable Salvatore Micalizzi CM
- Born: 5 November 1856; Naples, Kingdom of the Two Sicilies
- Died: 14 October 1937 (aged 80); Naples, Kingdom of Italy

Salvatore Micalizzi (5 November 1856 – 14 October 1937) was an Italian Roman Catholic priest and a professed member of the Congregation of the Mission, in his desire to follow the footsteps of Vincent de Paul. Micalizzi served as a preacher and became a well-known evangelizer in Naples.

Micalizzi's beatification process commenced in 1957; Pope Benedict XVI named him as venerable on 16 December 2006.

== Life ==
Salvatore Micalizzi was born in Naples on 5 November 1856. He was the eldest of six children to Vincenzo Micalizzi and Elisabetta De Martino. Micalizzi and his siblings were born into his father's second marriage after the latter was widowed and moved from Palermo to Naples. His father died in 1865, during a cholera outbreak (in which he too was a victim but recovered) and he was forced to provide for his mother and siblings for being the firstborn. His mother later died in 1874. He then entered the care of his mother's cousin.

He completed his education at the age of seventeen in the same school that Pasquale Attari (1837-1893) ran for men who were considering the ecclesiastical path. Micalizzi commenced his studies for the priesthood some time around 1876, and was vested in the habit of the seminarian for the first time. He went on a spiritual retreat on 30 July 1876.

Micalizzi was ordained to priesthood on 23 September 1882 in the Cathedral of Naples, he was ordained by the Archbishop of Naples, Guglielmo Sanfelice d'Acquavilla. Micalizzi served as a parish priest in Naples until 1884. He entered the Congregation of the Mission in Naples on 24 May 1884 and made his perpetual vows on 25 May 1886. He preached numerous missions and had a particular interest in the ongoing formation of priests. His prowess as a priest even reached Pope Pius X who even wanted Micalizzi to relocate to Rome to serve as his counselor. The Pontiff received Micalizzi in a private audience four times during his pontificate.

Micalizzi returned to Naples in October 1918 from missions he conducted in Lecce since 1911. His declining health in 1922, obliged him to cease his missions and return to Naples where he served as an apt confessor. His confessional was bombarded due to a great number of people who wanted to confess to him in particular and he remained in the booth for almost 12 hours each time he was there. He held a session of the Spiritual Exercises of Ignatius of Loyola on 6 October 1937, a week before his death. Micalizzi felt unwell on 10 October 1937, and was advised to go to bed in order to recuperate. He died in the morning of 14 October 1937 and was discovered at 4:30 am when his attendant found him dead on his knees beside his bed. The news of his death spread across Naples which prompted hundreds to attend his funeral. He was exhumed on 25 February 1958, while his remains were relocated on 3 July 1958 and placed into their current resting place the following 9 July.

== Beatification process ==
The beatification process commenced on 23 February 1957, under Pope Pius XII, in an informative process that the Archbishop of Naples, Cardinal Marcello Mimmi, opened; Mimi closed it in 1960. Interrogatories and documentation on the life and holiness of Micalizzi were all accumulated and sent to the Congregation for the Causes of Saints, which validated the process on 5 July 1985. The positio was delivered to the Congregation in 1998, at which point the latter would transfer it over to professional consultants for their own assessment. Theologians voiced their approval to the contents of the dossier on 14 June 2005 while the Congregation did likewise on 3 October 2006.

Micalizzi was titled as Venerable on 16 December 2006, after Pope Benedict XVI acknowledged that Micalizzi had lived a life of heroic virtue. A miracle attributed to Micalizzi's intercession was investigated in Naples due to the cure of an individual dating 1998. The Congregation validated the process on 20 October 2000, while a medical board voted on it on 27 October 2010. The board voted in favor of the miracle on on 16 January 2014. The postulator assigned to the cause is Shijo Kanjirathamkunnel.
