= Vannes Cathedral =

Roman Catholic Church

Coordinates: 47.658°N 2.757°W

Saint Peter's Cathedral of Vannes Cathédrale Saint-Pierre de Vannes
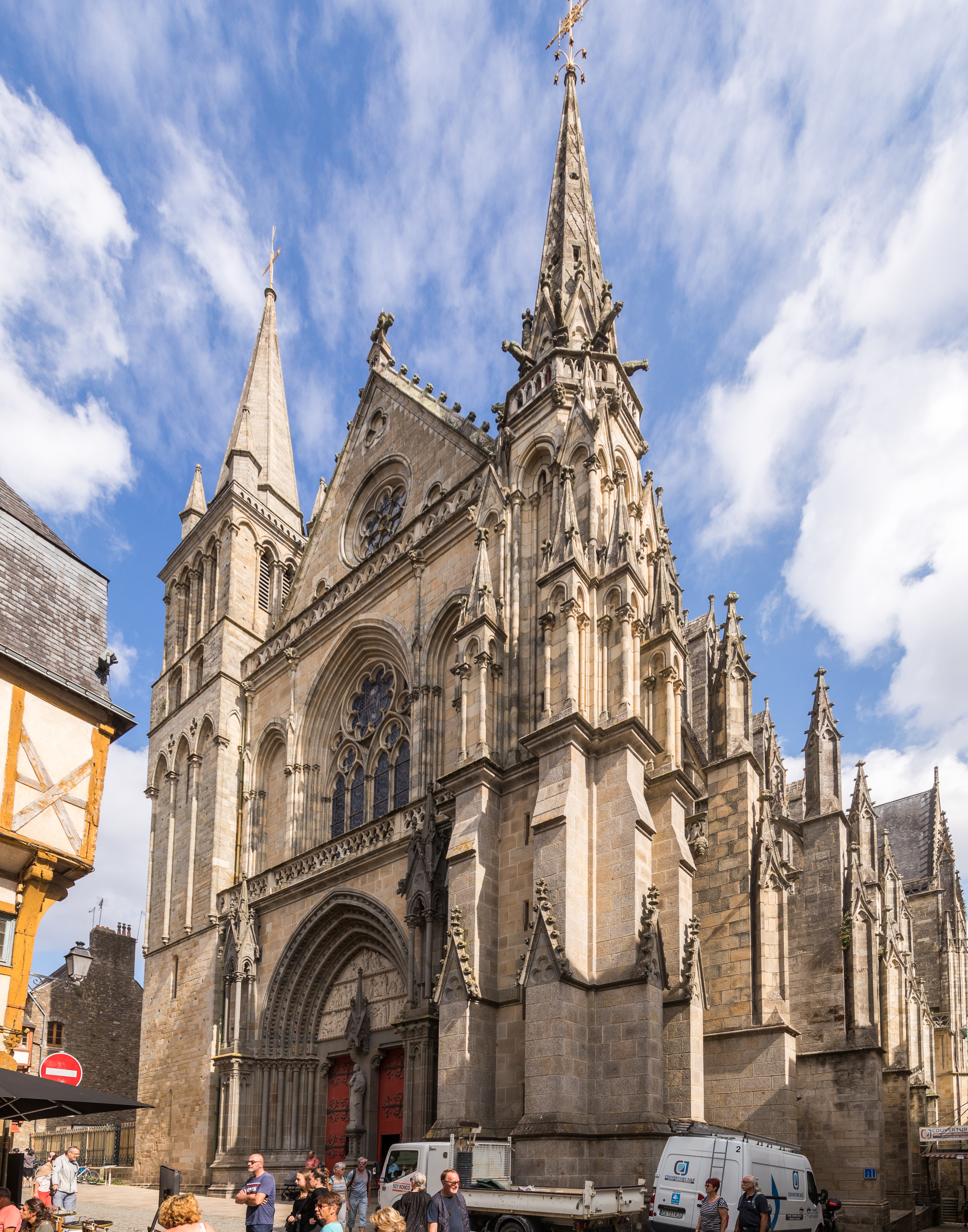
- Vannes Cathedral

Religion
- Affiliation: Roman Catholic Church
- Province: Bishop of Vannes
- Region: Morbihan
- Rite: Roman
- Ecclesiastical or organisational status: Cathedral, basilica minor (5 June 1870)
- Status: Active

Location
- Location: Vannes, France
- Interactive map of Saint Peter's Cathedral of Vannes; Cathédrale Saint-Pierre de Vannes

Architecture
- Type: church
- Style: Gothic, Romanesque
- Groundbreaking: 11th century
- Completed: 18th century

Vannes Cathedral (French: Cathédrale Saint-Pierre de Vannes; Breton: Iliz-veur Gwened (Iliz-veur Sant-Pêr)) is a Roman Catholic church dedicated to Saint Peter in Vannes, Brittany, France. The cathedral is the seat of the Bishop of Vannes.

The present Gothic church was erected on the site of the former Romanesque cathedral. Its construction lasted from the 15th to the 19th centuries; if the length of the existence of the 13th century Romanesque bell tower is included, a total of seven centuries of construction.

The cathedral was declared a basilica minor by Pope Pius IX on 5 June 1870.

== History ==
The first building was erected around 1020 in Romanesque style. Built out of granite and continuously modified by adding new structures, the cathedral is an extremely composite building. The rebuilding in Gothic style dates mainly from the 15th and 16th centuries. In this period the nave and the ornate gateway at the northern end of the north transept – whose twelve niches, according to Breton custom, were supposed to accommodate the Apostles – were built high. The northern tower is the main remnant of the former Romanesque building, while the vaults and the choir were built between 1771 and 1774.

== Architecture ==
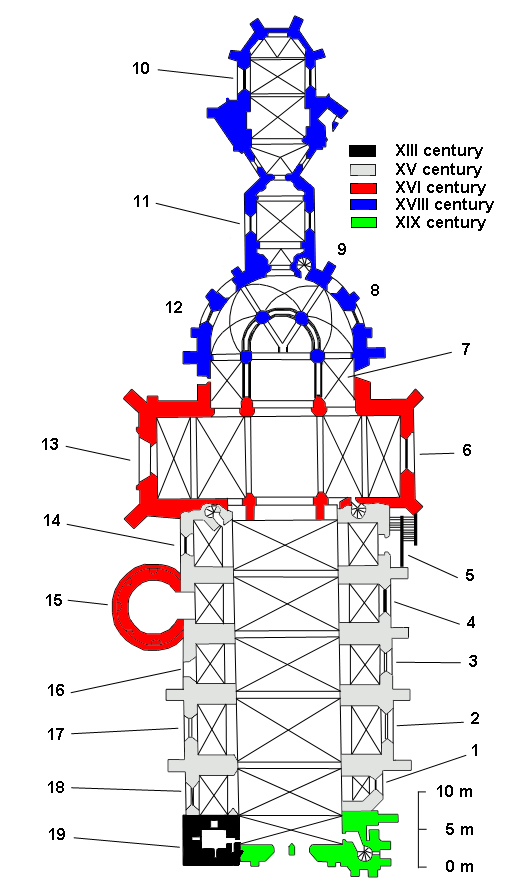
Ground plan of the cathedral itself.

=== Dimensions ===
The horizontal dimensions of the building can be derived from the ground plan. (Data on the heights are not available for the moment). The building is one of the largest on the French Atlantic coast.

=== Exterior ===
The façade was carved in 1857 in a neo-Gothic style. Outside, in front of the central pillar of the large gate, stands a statue of the Dominican friar St. Vincent Ferrer, from Valencia. His activities in the 15th century greatly influenced Christianity in Vannes. The northern façade opens onto the garden of the cloister (ruins from the 16th century) and the Rue des chanoines ("Street of the Canons") through the beautiful portal at the top of the north transept, built in a Flamboyant late Gothic style (1514), and decorated with twelve niches designed to house statues of the twelve apostles. The cross, visible close to the northern façade, dates back to the 15th century and was brought from the cemetery.

=== Interior ===
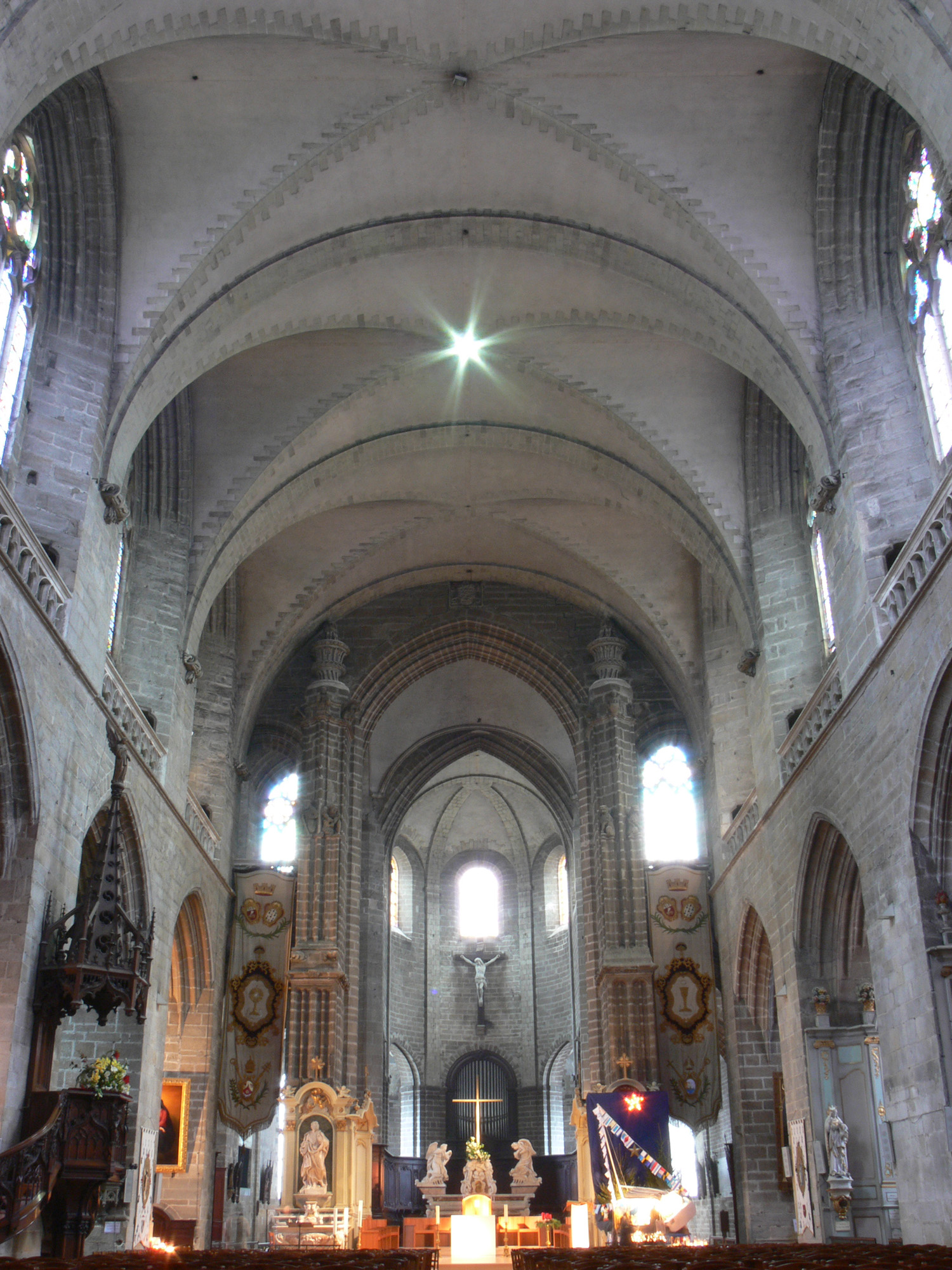
The nave with the altar and statues of St. Peter and St. Paul (December 2006)

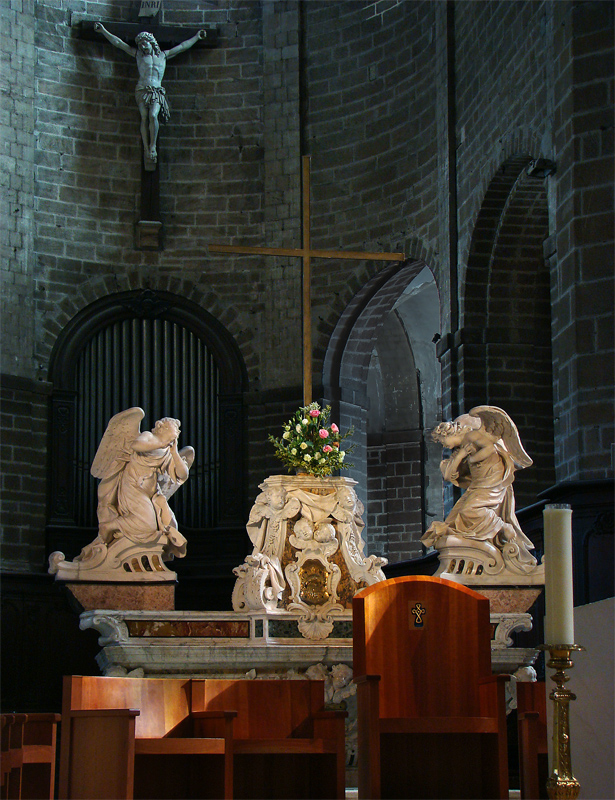
The main altar

During the Middle Ages, the floor of the cathedral had been covered by tombstones. For hygienic reasons, only the tradition of burying the bishops in their episcopal church has been preserved. However, some tombstones have been returned and can be seen today. The cathedral has only retained tombs dating back to the 17th century. Two bishops' tombs can be found in the crypt under the choir.

The building contains the following features:

- Chapel of the Ancient Baptismal Fonts (pos. 1 ground plan): this chapel is too small for actual baptizing to take place, but carries the spirit of baptism. The feeling is further enhanced by the stained glass window, displaying motifs of baptism.
- St. Anne's Chapel (pos. 2): Saint Anne is the patroness saint of Brittany. Here, as in Nantes Cathedral, she enjoys special attention, especially with her statue. The stained glass window shows the pilgrimage of Sainte-Anne-d'Auray, other important events of her life, and one of the Blessed Virgin.
- Chapel of the Rosary of the Saints Hearts (pos. 3): the stained glass window is one of the first showing the Sacred Heart of Paray. It is related to the window above the choir.
- Chapel of the Blessed Pierre René Roque (pos. 4): Blessed Pierre René Roque (1758-1796) was a priest, born in Vannes, known for his strong devotion to religion. He was condemned to death and guillotined for bringing communion to a dying man; he was beatified in 1934. He is buried under the altar.

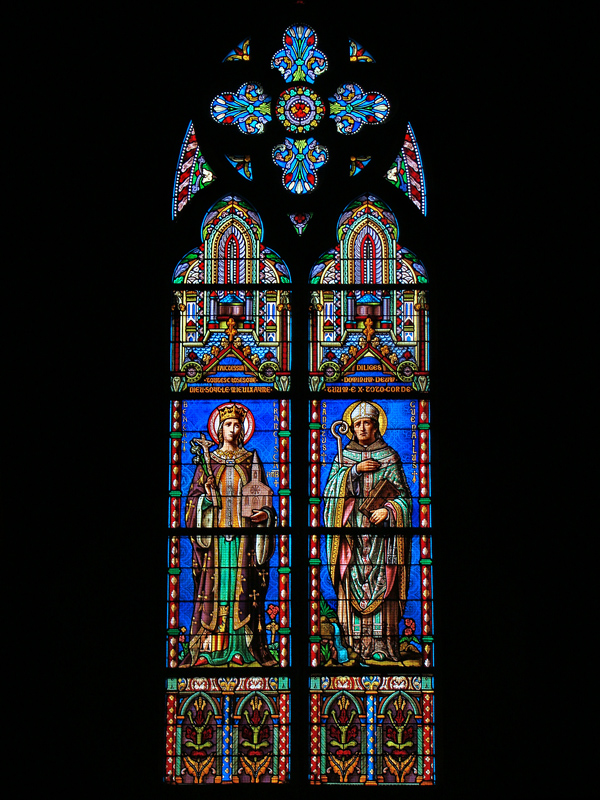
St. Gwenaël's Chapel

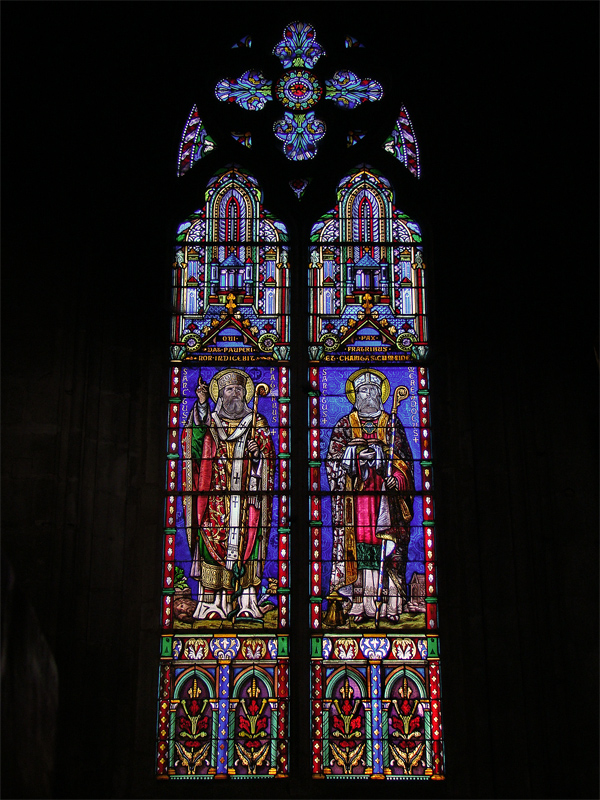
Chapel of St. Mériadec and St. Patern

- St. Gwenaël's Chapel, south entrance (pos. 5): Saint Gwenaël took part in the evangelization of the West Diocese in the 6th century. In the stained glass window he is represented in the company of Blessed Françoise d'Amboise, duchess of Brittany and the founder of the first convent of the Carmelites in Vannes.
- The Liturgical Choir: the three Fossati altars date back to the 18th century. The statues of Saints Peter and Paul are placed above the two small altars.
- Our Lady of Lourdes' Chapel, south transept (pos. 6): this is the place of the old door of the Dukes of Brittany. The stained glass window shows the First Communion of Françoise d'Amboise. Above the window is Saint Peter, to the left a painting of the ascent of Saint Petronilla to Heaven. Before the French Revolution, this was the site of the tomb of St. Gwenaël. To the right of the altar Mme. Francheville is buried, a local mystic.
- Ambulatory (pos. 7): the ambulatory is very large to accommodate the pilgrims that used to pray at the tomb of St. Vincent Ferrer in the Middle Ages. A marble tablet indicates the affiliation of the cathedral to St. Peter's Basilica in Rome. The cathedral in Vannes also carries the title of Basilica.
- The Treasury (pos. 8): this room was constructed in about 1782 in a part of the Romanesque choir. The walls are covered with beautiful woodwork and panelling. The shelves contain books on theology and religious history. The most remarkable item is a box made of wood and covered with painted parchment of southern origin. It dates back to the 12th century and is decorated with scenes of daily life. Among the other notable objects of the treasury are a gold cross and two ivory sticks.

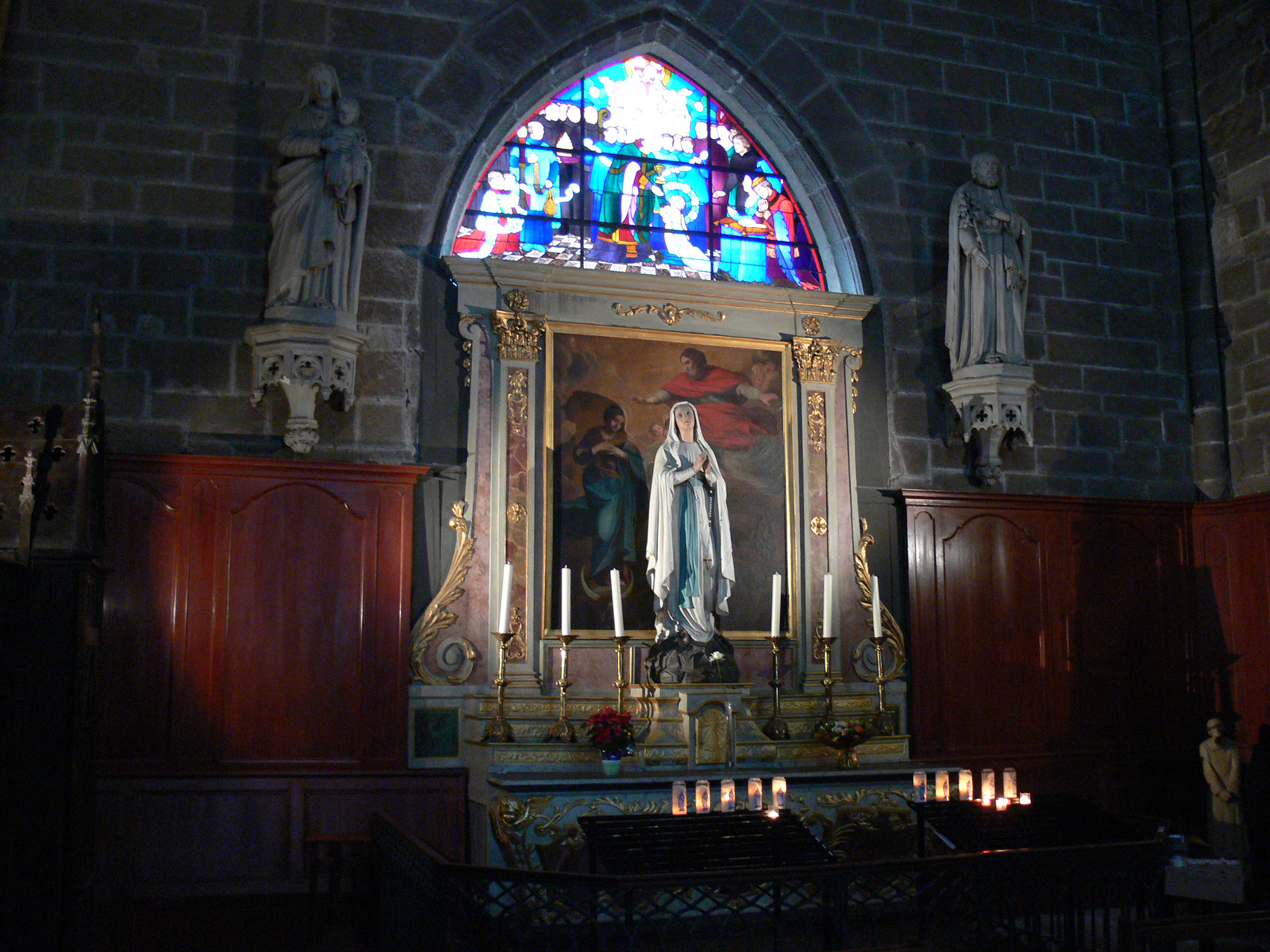
Saint Anne's Chapel in Vannes Cathedral (December 2006)

- Portal of the Canons, north transept (pos. 13): St. Vincent Ferrer's tomb was located here until 1956. There is still a stained glass window depicting him. There are also two paintings, one by Gosse (1945) and one by Mauzaise (1831). The former shows the death of the saint and the latter depicts him preaching to infidels. This is the place where baptism is currently celebrated.
- Our Lady of Mercy Chapel (pos. 14): here there is a painting of the Virgin and child by Delaval (1836). There is also a stained glass window showing Saint Yves. He enjoys a special position in all Breton churches, as a patron saint of the Breton Rectors, and also as the main defender of the independence of the Breton churches against the royal power.
- St. Vincent Ferrer's Chapel (pos. 15): this was formerly the chapel of the Holy Sacrament, but since 1956 it has housed the relics of Saint Vincent Ferrer, including his skull.
- St. Anthony's Chapel, north entrance (pos. 16): here there is a painting by Vincent from 1830 depicting Jesus Christ on the Cross, Saint John, the Holy Virgin and Saint Mary Magdalene.
- Chapel of St. Mériadec and St. Patern (pos. 18): the stained glass window here represents Saint Meriadec and Saint Patern, the first Bishop of Vannes. There are also paintings, one by Rivoulon from 1846, "Litanies of the Holy Virgin", and one by Destouches from 1819 of the Resurrection of Saint Lazarus.
- Romanesque tower (pos. 19): this is the only structure left from the Romanesque cathedral. It accommodates the four bells of the church.

Positions 9, 10, 11, 13 and 17 are the Blessed Sacrament Chapel (closed to visitors), the Chapel of Our Lady de Pitié, the Chapel in the apse, the Calvary and the Chapel of St. Louis respectively.

== In literature ==
In the novels of Alexandre Dumas, the musketeer Aramis appears at one point as Bishop of Vannes and logically must have served in this very cathedral.

== Burials ==
- Isabella of Scotland, Duchess of Brittany
- St. Vincent Ferrer

== Gallery ==
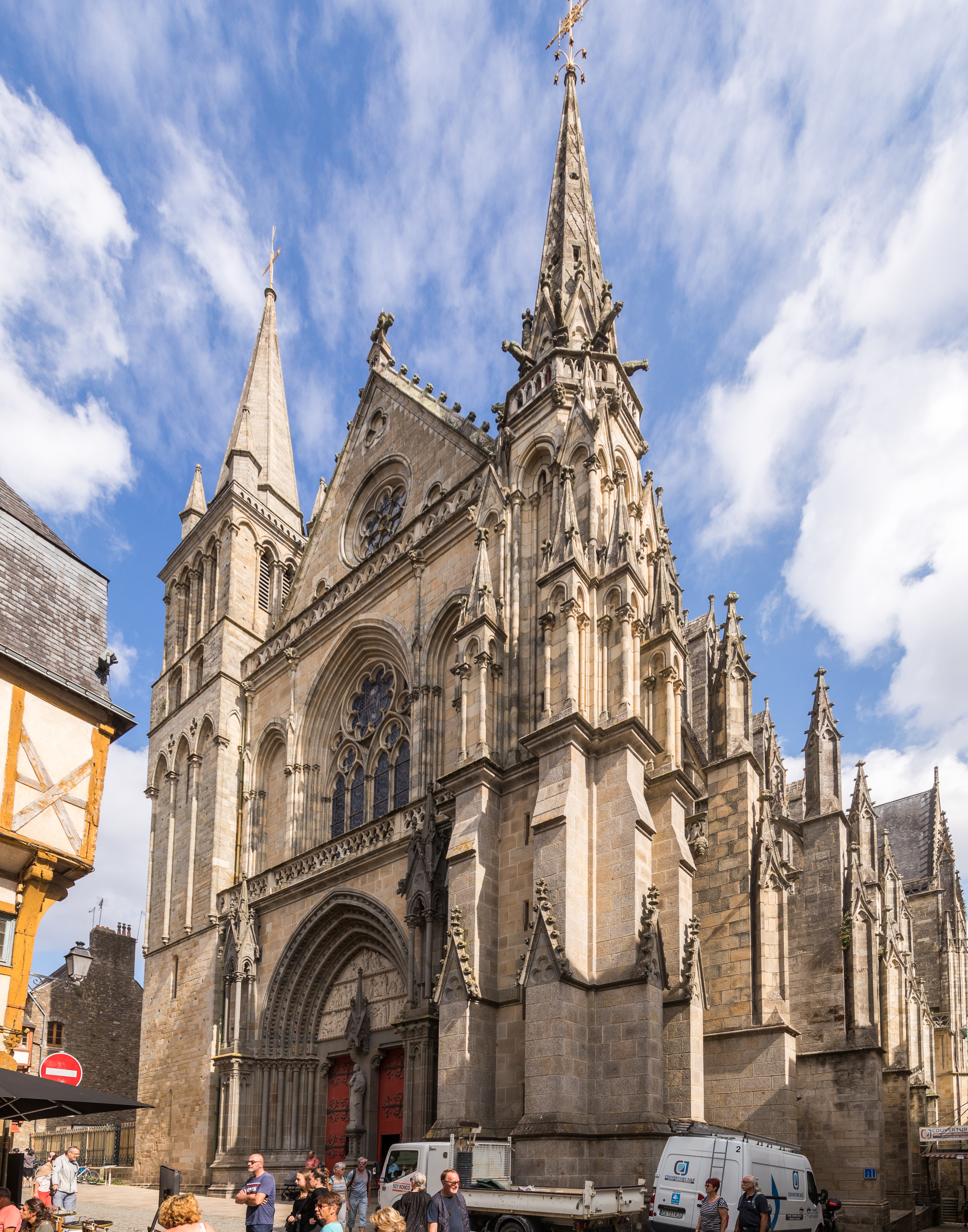

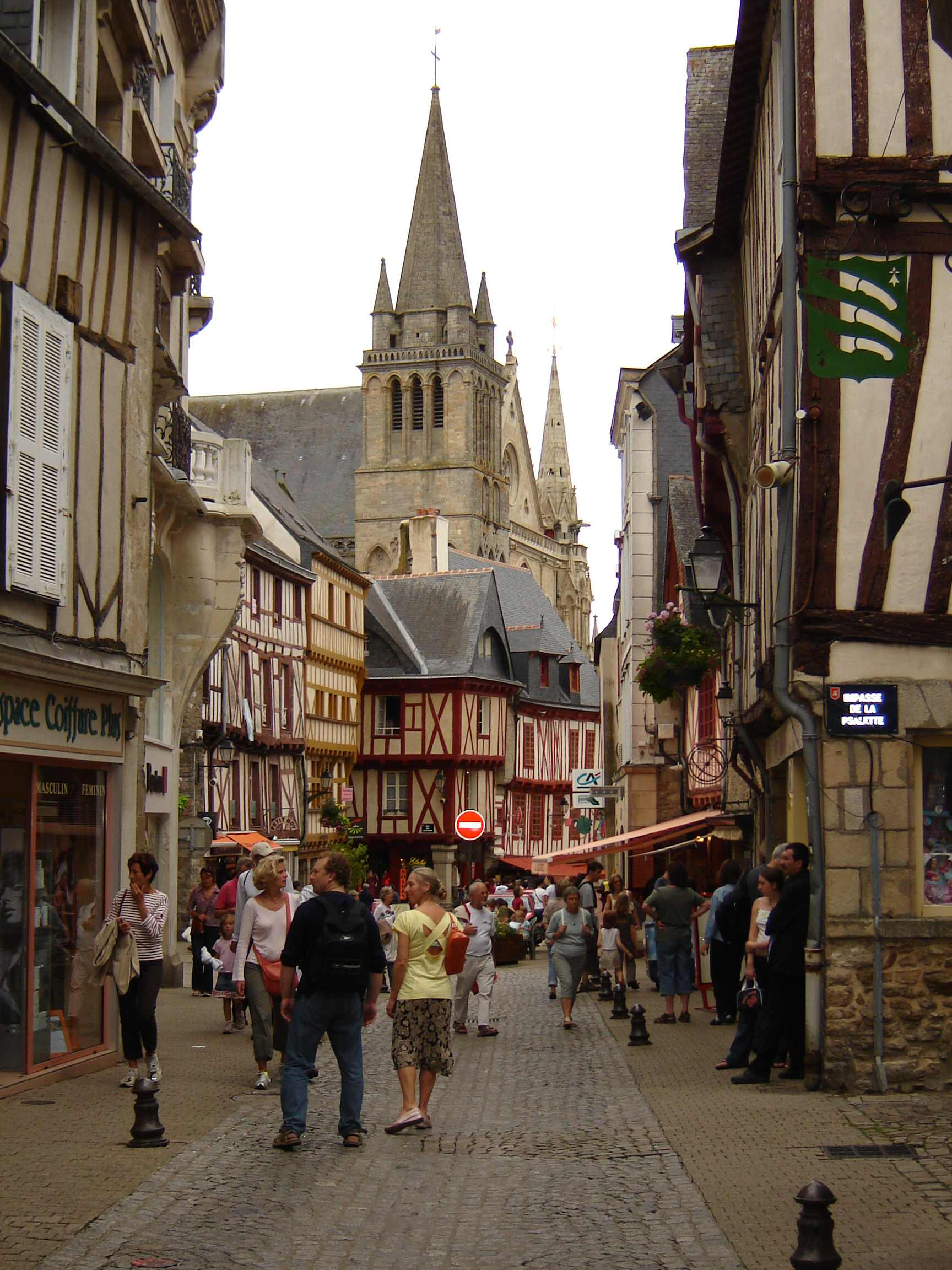

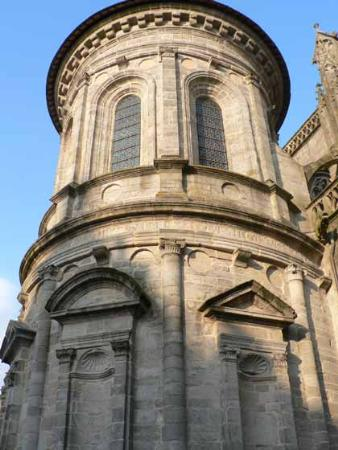

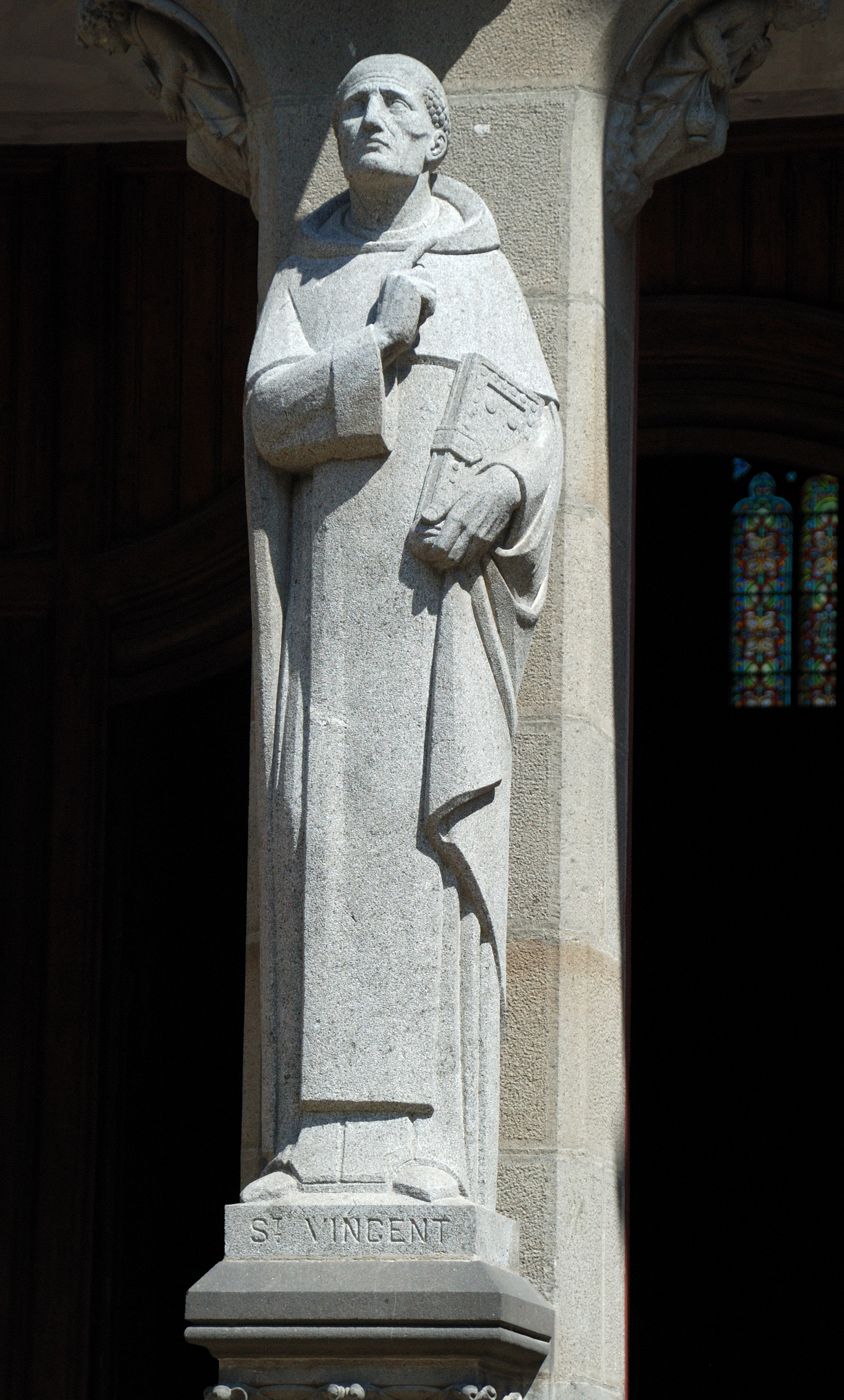

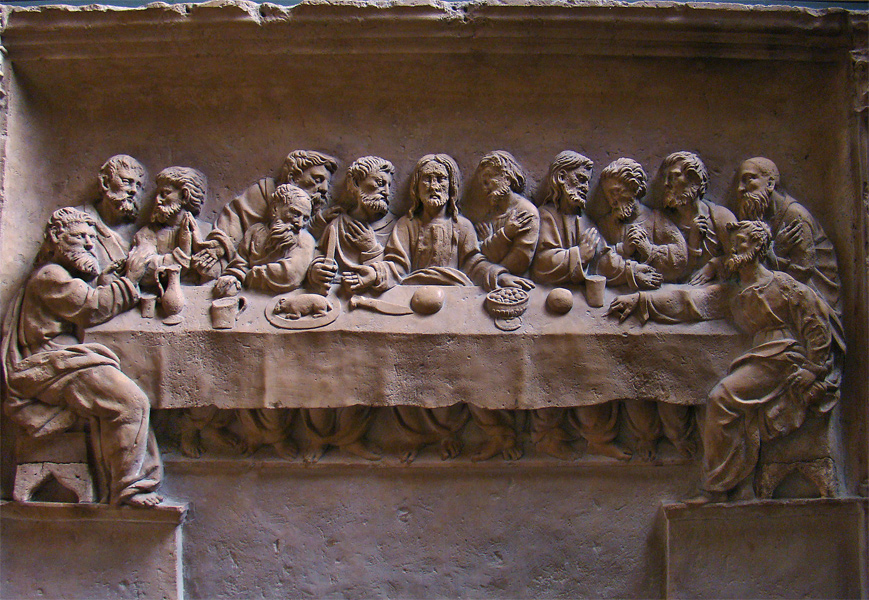

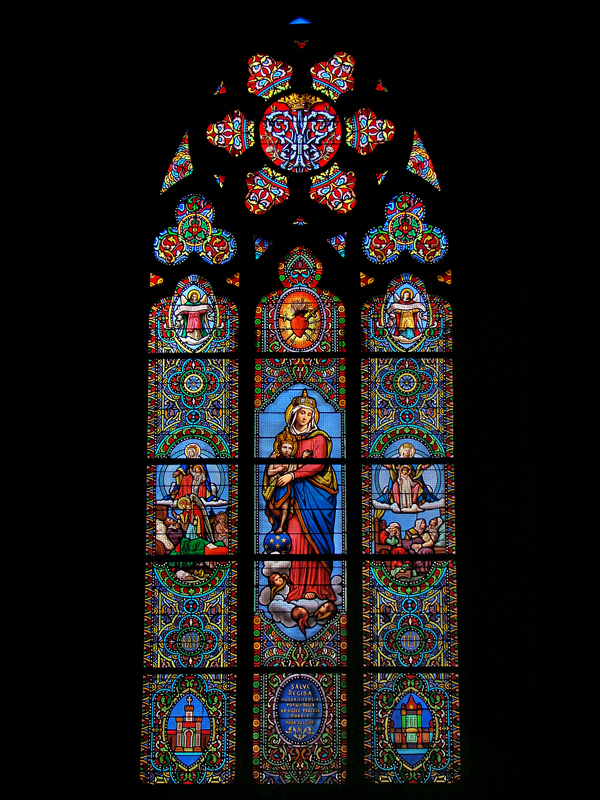

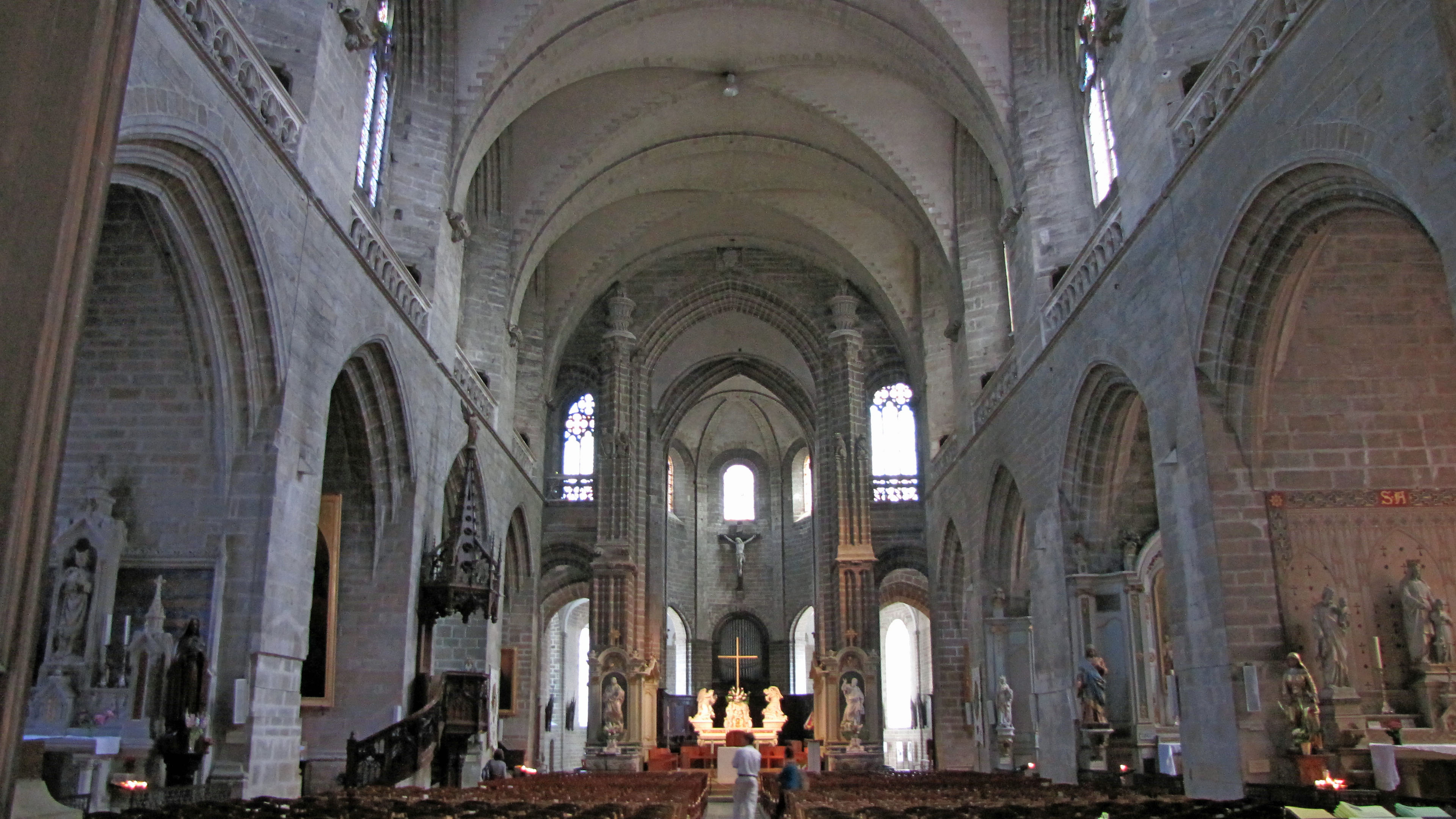

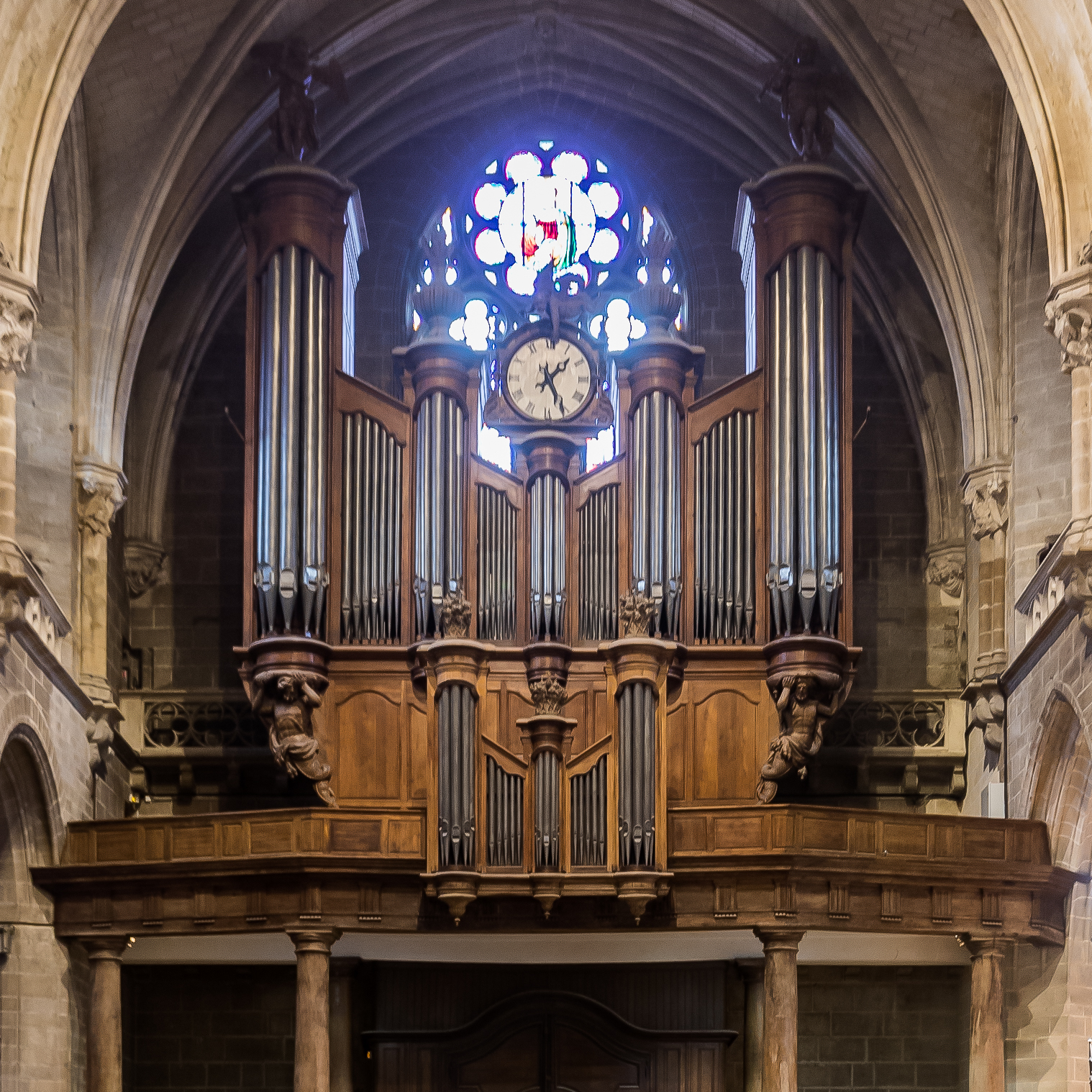

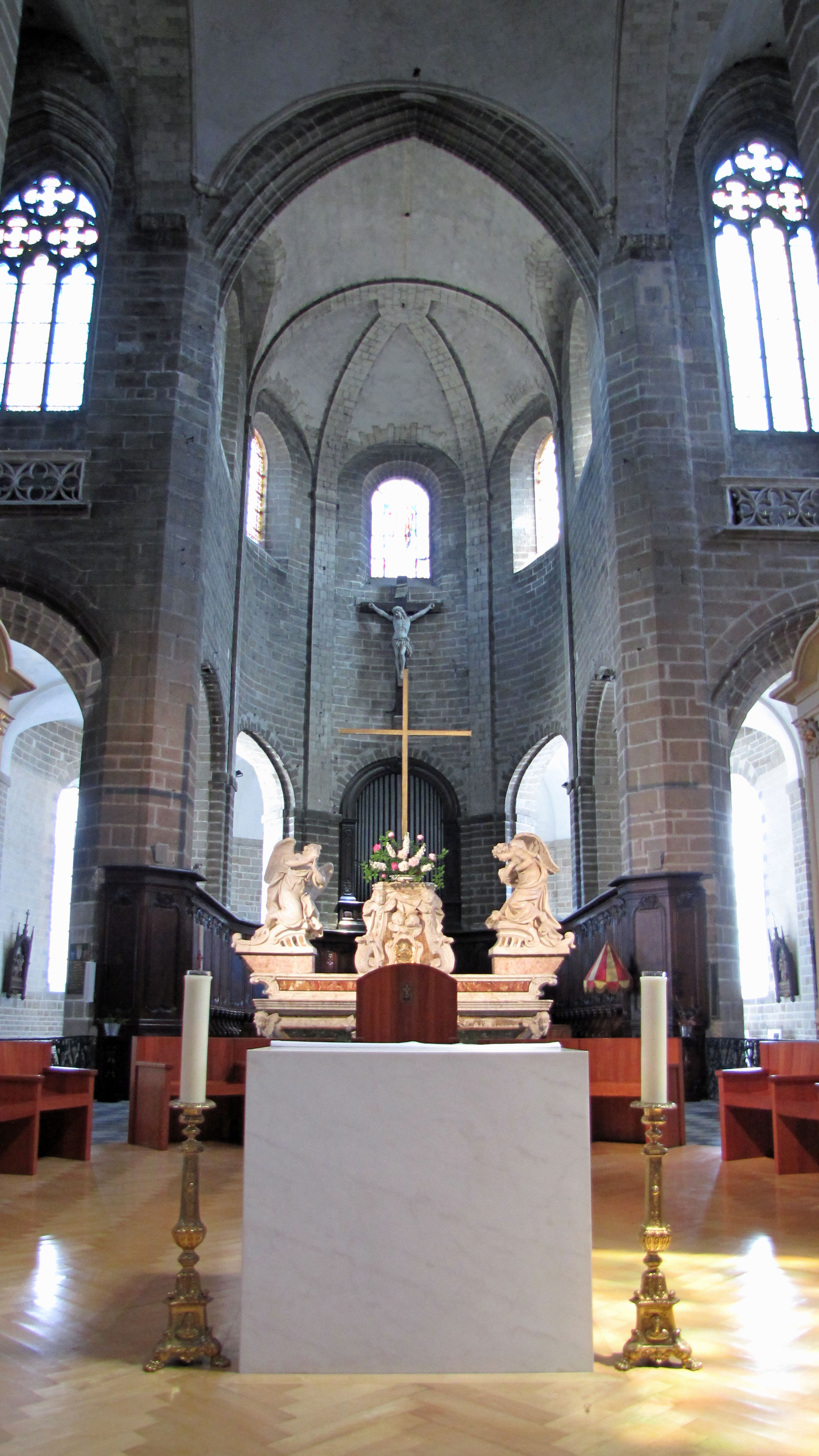
