= Congregation of the Mission =

Catholic society of apostolic life

- Congregatio Missionis
- Abbreviation: CM
- Nickname: Vincentians, Paules, Lazarites, Lazarists, Lazarians
- Established: April 17, 1625; 401 years ago
- Founder: Vincent de Paul
- Founded at: Paris, France
- Type: Society of Apostolic Life of Pontifical Right (for Men)
- Headquarters: General Motherhouse; Via dei Capasso 30, 00164 Rome, Italy
- Location: Rome, Italy
- Members: 3,100 as of 2021
- Motto: Latin: Evangelizare pauperibus misit me English: He sent me to bring Good News to the poor
- Superior General: Tomaž Mavrič, CM
- Patron: Saint Vincent de Paul, CM
- Main organ: Nuntia and Vincentiana
- Parent organization: Catholic Church
- Website: https://congregatiomissionis.org/en/

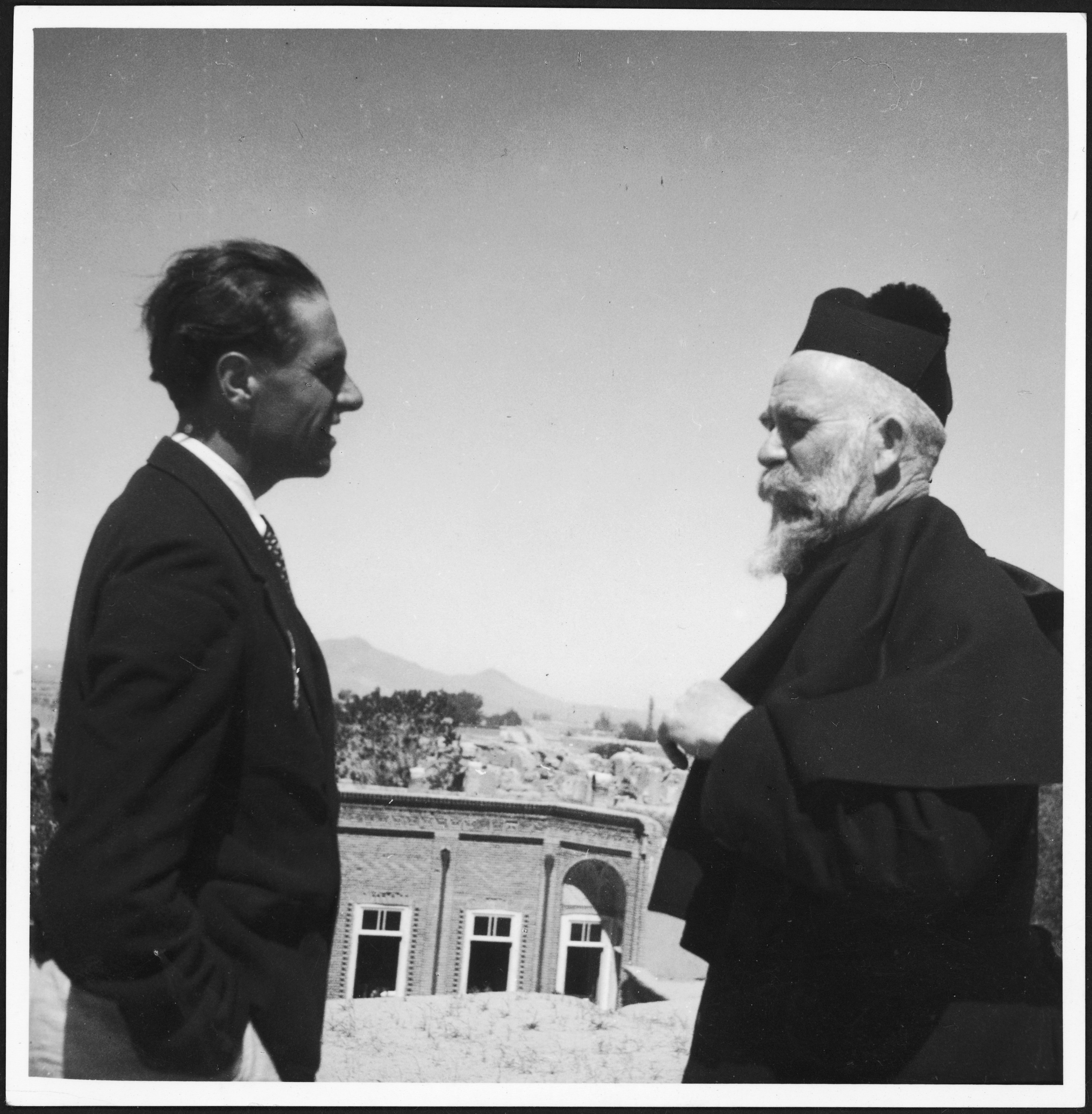
Father Franssen, head of the French Vincentian Mission in Urumiah, Iran (c. 1934)

The Congregation of the Mission (Latin: Congregatio Missionis), abbreviated CM and commonly called the Vincentians or Lazarists, is a Catholic society of apostolic life of pontifical right for men founded by Vincent de Paul. It is associated with the Vincentian Family, a loose federation of organizations that consider Vincent de Paul as their founder or patron.

== Mission ==
Inspired by the "first mission" of Chátillon-les-Dombes and Folleville, where he delivered his first mission sermon, St. Vincent de Paul found that there was a need for popular missions and general confessions throughout the most abandoned areas of France. He sought to fill this need by forming a group of missionaries, and in 1625 he founded the Congregation of the Mission as an apostolic society together with other priests: Anthony Portail, M. Belin, Francis de Coudray and John de la Salle. Years later, this mission would decide to invoke a passage in Luke's gospel as its motto: Evangelizare pauperibus misit me ("The Holy Spirit sent me to bring the Good News to the poor", Luke 4:18).

In 1633, St. Vincent de Paul and St. Louise de Marillac founded the Company of the Daughters of Charity, a group of women dedicated to serving the "poorest of the poor". The services the Company offered included prayer and community living, with a spirit of humility, simplicity and charity.

== History ==
The Congregation originated with the successful mission to the common people conducted by Vincent de Paul and five other priests on the estates of the Gondi family. More immediately, it dates from 1624, when the little community acquired a permanent settlement in the Collège des Bons Enfants in Paris, which later became a seminary under the name of St. Firmin. The first missions of the Vincentians were in the suburbs of Paris and in Picardy and Champagne. Archiepiscopal recognition of the mission was obtained in 1626. By a papal bull on January 12, 1633, the society was constituted as a congregation, with Vincent de Paul as its head. At about the same time, the canons regular of St. Victor handed over to the congregation their priory of Saint Lazare (formerly a lazar-house or leper hospital, now known as Saint Lazare Prison) in Paris, which led to its members being popularly known as Lazarists. The Congregation was founded with the mission of catechizing the poor, training clergy, and serving in foreign missions.

Within a few years the Vincentians had acquired another house in Paris and set up other establishments throughout France; missions were also sent to Italy (1638), Tunis (1643), Algiers and Ireland (1646), Madagascar (1648), Poland (1651), and Turkey (1783). A bull of Alexander VII in April 1655 further confirmed the society; this was followed by a brief in September of the same year, regulating its constitution. The rules then adopted, which were framed on the model of those of the Jesuits, were published at Paris in 1668 under the title Regulae seu constitutiones communes congregationis missionis. Its special aims were religious instruction of the poor, training of the clergy, and foreign missions.

In 1783, the Lazarists' role in the Middle East and China increased after the Jesuits were suppressed and the Lazarists appointed to replace Jesuit leadership in these regions.

On the eve of the French Revolution, Saint Lazare was plundered by the mob and the congregation was later suppressed; it was restored by Napoleon in 1804 at the desire of Pius VII, abolished by him in 1809 in consequence of a quarrel with the pope, and again restored in 1816. The Vincentians were expelled from Italy in 1871 and from Germany in 1873.

The Vincentian province of Poland was singularly prosperous; at the date of its suppression in 1796, it possessed thirty-five establishments. The Congregation of the Mission was permitted to return to Poland in 1816, where it remains active. In Madagascar it had a mission from 1648 until 1674. In 1783, Vincentians were appointed to take the place of the Jesuits in the Levantine and Chinese missions; and in 1874 their establishments throughout the Ottoman Empire numbered sixteen. Additionally, they established missions in Persia, Abyssinia, Mexico, the South American republics, Portugal, Spain, and Russia, some of which were later suppressed. In the same year they had fourteen establishments in the United States of America.

In the 1890s, the debates of the Modernist Controversy divided Lazarist seminaries into "conservative" and "progressive" groups. These debates focused on the nature and knowability of truth, the historical nature of the Catholic Church's articulations of faith, and the roles of religion and states.

== Mother House ==
The Mother House (Maison Mère) is a building designated as the successor of the first Mother House, which had been the former priory of Saint Lazare. This house, located at 95 rue de Sèvres, was the former residence of the Duke of Lorges, and was made available to the Congregation of the Mission by the French government in 1817. In 2006, the French State officially made the Congregation of the Mission the owner of the house and its grounds.

The Mother House consists of a series of buildings around a paved courtyard. The entrance is in the central neo-Renaissance style pavilion at the back of the courtyard. In a niche on the façade is a statue of Saint Vincent de Paul.

Currently, for the occasion of the 400th anniversary of the Congregation of the Mission, the Vincentians are renovating the Mother House, with the aim of accommodating those seeking spiritual enrichment, especially members of all branches of the Vincentian Family, pilgrims and people of faith.

== Vincentian Family ==
There are people who do not belong to groups or congregations of consecrated life, but who live according to the spirituality and charism of St. Vincent; these are volunteers who work in parishes, schools, hospitals and many other places.

The spirituality of Vincent de Paul has influenced the foundation of other societies of apostolic life and even of some institutes of consecrated life which, in communion, form today what is called the Vincentian family.^{8} There are 170 congregations, with 2 million people involved, and groups of lay people, which have grown from a "family" to a "movement", reaching almost 4 million people:

- the Daughters of Charity, founded by Vincent de Paul himself, with the help of Louise de Marillac in 1633,
- the Sisters of Charity of St. Vincent de Paul of Novara, a religious congregation founded in 1773 in Italy,
- the Sisters of Charity of St. Vincent de Paul of Majorca, founded in Spain in 1798,
- the Sisters of Charity of St. Vincent de Paul, founded by Jeanne Antide Touret in Canada in 1799,
- the Sisters of Charity of St. Vincent de Paul of Gijzegem, founded in Belgium in 1818,
- the Sisters of Charity of St. Vincent de Paul of Fulda, founded in Germany in 1835,
- the Sisters of Charity of St. Vincent de Paul of Innsbruck, founded in Austria in 1835,
- the Sisters of Charity of St. Vincent de Paul of Paderborn, founded in Germany in 1840,
- the Sisters of Charity of St. Vincent de Paul of Hildesheim, founded in Germany in 1852,
- the Sisters of Charity of St. Vincent de Paul of Freiburg, also founded in Germany in 1853,
- the Sisters of Charity of St. Vincent de Paul of Halifax, founded in Canada,
- the Sisters of Charity of St. Vincent de Paul of Zagreb, founded in the former Yugoslavia,
- the Sisters of Charity of St. Vincent de Paul of the Prince of Palagonia, founded in Parmelo, Italy, in 1835,
- the Sisters of Providence of Kingston, founded in Canada,
- the Malabar Vincentians of the Syro-Malabar rite, founded in India in 1927,
- and the Vincentian laity, who share the work and spirituality of the Congregation of the Mission and of the various Vincentian congregations or societies. There are many Vincentian lay groups, among them the Society of St. Vincent de Paul, the Vincentian Marian Youth, the Miraculous Medal Association, the Volunteers of Charity and the members of the Conferences of St. Vincent de Paul.

== Present day ==
In 2022, the Congregation of the Mission had 3,099 incorporated members, of whom 2,781 were priests. They have 476 houses, spread over five vice-provinces: Mozambique, Nigeria, Costa Rica and St. Cyril and Methodius (Ukraine), and thirty-seven provinces on five continents.

- Africa: Madagascar, St. Justin de Jacobis (Eritrea), Ethiopia, Kenya and Congo.
- America: Central America (comprising Guatemala, El Salvador, Nicaragua, and Panama), Argentina (comprising Paraguay, Uruguay, and Argentina), Brazil (with three provinces, Rio de Janeiro, Curitiba, and Fortaleza), Chile, Colombia, Cuba, Ecuador, United States (with five provinces, Dallas, Philadelphia, Los Angeles, New England, and St. Louis), Mexico, Peru, Puerto Rico, and Venezuela.
- Asia: China, India (North and South), Indonesia, the Philippines, and the Orient (including Lebanon, Egypt, Israel, and Syria).
- Europe: Austria, Germany, Slovakia, Slovenia, Spain (with two provinces, St. Vincent de Paul - Spain and Saragossa), France (with two provinces, Paris and Toulouse), Holland, Hungary, Ireland, Italy (with three provinces, Naples, Rome and Turin), Poland, and Portugal.
- Oceania: Australia.

As of 2021, the Vincentians number about 3,100 worldwide, with a presence in 95 different countries. Its specific apostolate remains the evangelization of the poor and the formation of the clergy. As of 2017, Tomaž Mavrič is the incumbent worldwide superior general of the Congregation of the Mission, elected during its general assembly on July 5, 2016.

=== Opus Prize Finalist ===
On August 30, 2007, The Catholic University of America, (with the Opus Prize 2004 Foundation, affiliated with The Opus Group), announced that it would award on November 8 a $1-million and two $100,000 Humanity prizes to finalist organizations which contributed to solve most persistent social problems: John Adams (of So Others Might Eat which serves the poor and homeless in Washington, DC); Stan Goetschalckx (founder and director of AHADI International Institute in Tanzania which educates refugees from Congo, Rwanda, and Burundi); and Bebot Carcellar of the Vincentian Missionaries Social Development Foundation. On November 8, 2007, David M. O'Connell, president of Catholic University, personally bestowed these Opus Prizes at the university's Edward J. Pryzbyla University Center.

== Philippines ==
In 2008 the Vincentian family marked 150 years in the Philippines, led by the provincial Bienvenido M. Disu, Gregorio L. Bañaga, President of Adamson University, and Archbishop Jesus Dosado of the Archdiocese of Ozamis. The Philippine province has a deacon, 5 incorporated brothers, and 97 priests. A major work is the housing program for hundreds of families, especially those affected by demolitions and relocations along the Philippine North and South Railways tracks.

The CBCP Newsletter announced on July 10, 2008, the appointment of the Philippine Marcelo Manimtim as director of Paris-based Centre International de Formation. Manimtim is the first Asian to hold the office.

=== Housing programs ===
In 1991, Carcellar was assigned to Payatas. With his "Planning for a new home, Systemic Change Strategy," he organized Philippine massive home constructions, which he began by a savings program at Payatas dumpsite. Carcellar's "The Homeless Peoples Federation Philippines" provided slum dwellers of Iloilo City and Mandaue City with initiatives to survive poverty. In 2008 it promoted savings in Southeast Asia, since the Philippine Federation affiliated with an international network called "Slum/Shack Dwellers International".

Another, younger Vincentian was also assigned by Cardinal Gaudencio Rosales as the Coordinator of the Housing Ministry of the Archdiocese of Manila.

=== Vincentian Center for Social Responsibility ===
On September 28, 2007, Philippine Vice President Noli De Castro welcomed the launching of the Vincentian Center for Social Responsibility by the Adamson University. The center intends to engage the Adamson's academic community more deeply and directly in nation-building and to directly respond to Millennium Development Goals' poverty alleviation initiatives in the country. De Castro also cited the Adamson University and a Vincentian priest named Atilano "Nonong" Fajardo for their efforts in putting up the Vincentian Center.

The Vincentian Center for Social Responsibility is also responsible for the creation of the Vincentian Facilitators, the Academic Social Responsibility, the Academic Social Entrepreneurship, and the Academic Social Journalism at the Vincentian-owned Adamson University. Through the Vincentian Center, the movement towards academic social networking has become a reality in the university. It is also responsible for organizing the First Northville and Southville People's Congress, consisting of around 750,000 relocatees from Metro Manila and the provinces of Cavite, Bulacan and Laguna.

== United States of America ==
The Vincentians travelled to the United States in 1816 and two years later established St. Mary's of the Barrens seminary. They founded Niagara University (1856), St. John's University (1870), and DePaul University (1898).

The Eastern Province's headquarters is located in Germantown, PA located next to the Basilica Shrine of the Miraculous Medal. The priests of this province serve in several parishes along the eastern sea board. The also founded and still run Niagara University along with St. John's University (New York City). They also has a sub-province in Panama.

The Western Province of the USA has a mission in Kenya, where in conjunction with parish ministry water projects have been initiated to provide clean water to the people.

The New England Province was founded in 1904 by Vincentians from Poland. They staff parishes in New York and Connecticut. The provincial headquarters is in Manchester, Connecticut.

== Prominent members of the congregation ==
Members of the congregation include:

- Thaddeus Amat y Brusi (1810–1878), first bishop of Los Angeles
- Andrew E. Bellisario, archbishop of Anchorage–Juneau
- E. Bore (died 1878), orientalist
- Georges Bou-Jaoudé (1943–2022), Archbishop of Tripoli, Lebanon for the Maronites
- Annibale Bugnini (1912–1982), secretary of the .
- P. Collet (1693–1770), writer on theology and ethics
- Armand David (1826–1900), Basque missionary and zoologist
- Jean-Claude Faveyrial (1813–1893), French historian and author of the first book on the history of Albania
- Pierre-Marie-Alphonse Favier (1837-1905), missionary to China, and Vicar Apostolic of North Zhili Province (1898-1905)
- Frederic Gehring (1903-1998), missionary to China and decorated chaplain to American forces during the Guadalcanal campaign
- Stéphanos II Ghattas (1920-2009), Patriarch of Alexandria for the Copts and cardinal
- J. de la Grive (1689-1757), geographer
- Joseph Lilly, translator of the Greek New Testament into English in 1946.
- Oscar Lukefahr, theologian, writer, and Christian apologist
- Évariste Régis Huc (1813-1860), missionary and traveller
- David M. O'Connell (1955-), Bishop of Trenton
- Pedro Opeka, Argentinian missionary in Madagascar
- Teodorico Pedrini (1671-1746), missionary to China and musician
- Stafford Poole (1936-2020), historian
- Michael Prior, (1942-2004), Irish priest, liberation theologian, outspoken critic of Zionism
- John T. Richardson (1923–2022), President of DePaul University
- Franc Rode (1934-), Cardinal and former Prefect of the Congregation for Institutes of Consecrated Life and Societies of Apostolic Life
- Joseph Rosati (1789-1843), first bishop of St. Louis, Missouri
- Joseph Patrick Slattery, (1866-1931) physicist, radiologist, pioneer in the field of radiography in Australia
- Aba Shlimon (aka Pere Desire Solomon, Khwaja Shlimon) late 19th century Urmia, Persia, an Assyrian scholar
- Bruce Vawter, chairman of religious studies at De Paul University from 1969 until 1986
- Berhaneyesus Demerew Souraphiel, Ethiopian archeparch of Addis Abeba and cardinal

== Saints and Blesseds ==
Saints

- Vincent de Paul (24 April 1581 – 27 September 1660), founder of the Congregation, canonized on 16 June 1737
- François-Régis Clet (19 August 1748 – 18 February 1820), missionary to China, martyr, canonized on 1 October 2000
- Jean-Gabirel Perboyre (6 January 1802 - 11 September 1840), missionary to China, martyr, canonized on 2 June 1996
- Giustino de Jacobis (9 October 1800 – 31 July 1860), missionary to Ethiopia, canonized on 26 October 1975

Blesseds

- Jean-Charles Caron (30 September 1730 – 3 September 1792), martyred during the French Revolution, beatified on 17 October 1926
- Nicolas Colin (12 December 1730 – 3 September 1792), martyred during the French Revolution, beatified on 17 October 1926
- Louis-Joseph François (3 February 1751 – 3 September 1792), martyred during the French Revolution, beatified on 17 October 1926
- Jean-Henri Gruyer (13 June 1734 – 3 September 1792), martyred during the French Revolution, beatified on 17 October 1926
- Pierre-René Rogue (11 June 1758 – 3 March 1796), martyred during the French Revolution, beatified on 10 May 1934
- Ghébrē-Michael (c. 1791 - 30 July 1855), convert from Eastern Rite, postulant of the Congregation, martyr, beatified on 3 October 1926
- Marcantonio Durando (22 May 1801 - 10 December 1880), priest of the Congregation and founder of the Daughters of the Passion of Jesus the Nazorean, beatified on 20 October 2002
- Fortunato Velasco Tobar and 13 Companions (died 1936), Martyrs of the Spanish Civil War, beatified on 13 October 2013
- Vicenç Queralt Lloret and 40 Companions (died 1936 and 1937), Martyrs of the Spanish Civil War, beatified on 11 November 2017
- Ján Havlík (12 February 1928 – 27 December 1965), seminarian of the Congregation, martyred by communist forces, beatified on 31 August 2024

Venerables

- Antônio Ferreira Viçoso (13 May 1787 - 7 July 1875), Bishop of Mariana, declared Venerable on 8 July 2014
- Salvatore Micalizzi (5 November 1856 - 14 October 1937), declared Venerable on 16 December 2006
- Janez Frančišek Gnidovec (29 September 1873 - 3 February 1939), Bishop of Skopje, declared Venerable on 27 March 2010

Servants of God

- Jean Le Vacher (15 March 1619 - 26 July 1683), missionary and martyr
- Felix [Felice] de Andreis (12 December 1778 - 15 October 1820)
- Buenaventura Codina Augerolas (3 June 1785 - 18 November 1857), bishop of Canarias
- Claude Chevrier and Vincentius Wu (died 20 June 1870), Martyrs of China
- Jorge María [Georges] Salvaire (6 January 1847 - 4 February 1899)
- Jules Garrigues and 5 Companions (died 1900), Martyrs of China
- Jacques-Émile Sontag and 3 Companions (died 18 and 27 July 1918), Martyrs of the Assyrian-Chaldean-Syriac Genocide
- Giuseppe Alloatti (7 July 1857 - 27 March 1933), founder of the Sisters of the Eucharist
- Franciscus Hubertus Schraven and 6 Companions (died 9 October 1937), Martyrs of China
- Giovanni Battista Manzella (21 January 1855 - 23 October 1937), founder of the Sisters of Gethsemane
- Piotr Szarek and 10 Companions (died 1939 - 1945), Martyrs under Nazi Occupation
- Janez Strašek (11 December 1906 - 30 March 1947), martyr
- Emilio Lissón Chávez (24 May 1872 - 24 December 1961), Archbishop of Lima
- Wacław Szuniewicz (28 December 1892 - 16 October 1963)
- Valeriano Güemes Rodríguez (12 September 1890 - 12 December 1978)
- Andraos Ghattas [Stéphanos II] (16 January 1920 - 20 January 2009), eparch of Alexandria of the Copts and Cardinal

== Universities ==
The religious congregation runs the following institutions of higher education:

- Adamson University (Philippines)
- DePaul University, Chicago (Western Province - United States)
- Faculdade Vicentina, Curitiba (Brazil)
- St. John's University, New York City (Eastern Province - United States)
- Niagara University, Lewiston, New York (Eastern Province - United States)

Institutions formerly run by the Congregation:

- All Hallows College, Dublin (Ireland)
- Irish College in Paris (France), administered by the Vincentians from 1858 until 1939.
- St Patrick's College, Drumcondra, Dublin (Ireland)
- St. Mary's University, Twickenham (United Kingdom)
- University of Dallas (United States)
- St. Vincent's College, forerunner to Loyola Marymount University; the present university is the successor to the first institution of higher learning in Southern California, St. Vincent's College. Vincentian Fathers were commissioned by Bishop Thaddeus Amat y Brusi to found this for boys in Los Angeles.

== Secondary schools ==
The Vincentian fathers also run a number of secondary schools, most notably in Dublin, Ireland, where the order is in charge of two such institutions.

- Castleknock College, Dublin, Ireland
- St. Paul's College, Raheny, Dublin, Ireland
- Colégio São Vicente de Paulo, Rio de Janeiro, Brazil
- St Stanislaus College, Bathurst, New South Wales, Australia
- Österreichisches Sankt Georgs-Kolleg, Istanbul, Turkey
- Liceum Ogólnokształcące w Centrum Edukacyjnym „Radosna Nowina 2000”, Piekary, Poland
- St Vincent College, Natovi, Fiji
- Saint Benoît High School, Istanbul, Turkiye

== See also ==
- Archconfraternity of Holy Agony
- Institute of consecrated life
- Saint Vincent de Paul Chapel in Paris
- Vocational discernment in the Catholic Church
- Church of the Mission of France
