= Gorce =

Gorce or La Gorce may refer to:

== Places ==
- Gorce Mountains in southern Poland
  - Gorce National Park, part of Western Beskids in Poland
- Gorce, a neighbourhood of Boguszów-Gorce, Poland
- Górce, a neighbourhood of Warsaw, Poland
- Gorče, a small settlement in Slovenia,
- La Gorce, a neighborhood of Miami Beach, Florida, United States
- La Gorce Island, Miami Beach, Florida
- La Gorce Mountains, Marie Byrd Land, Antarctica
- La Gorce Peak, part of the Alexandra Mountains, Marie Byrd Land

== Other uses ==
- Gorce (surname), including La Gorce and de La Gorce
- La Gorce Open, an American golf tournament

== See also ==
- Gorse (disambiguation)
