= Tournament of Vannes =

Jousting competition in Brittany in 1381

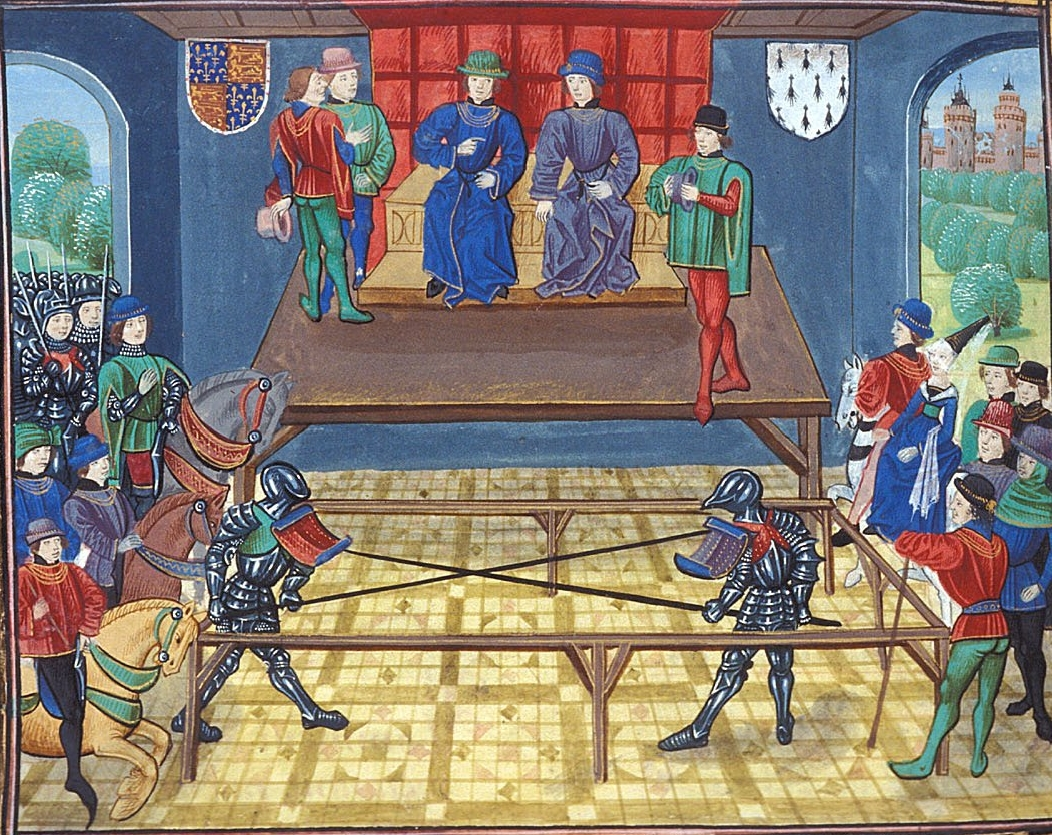
- Painted illustration of the tournament overseen by Buckingham and John IV
- Native name: Tournoi de Vannes
- Date: c. March 1381
- Venue: Outside the Ramparts of Vannes
- Location: Vannes, Brittany
- Type: Jousting
- Patrons: Thomas of Woodstock, Earl of Buckingham; John IV, Duke of Brittany

The Tournament of Vannes (French: Tournoi de Vannes) was a jousting tournament between a group of knights from the Kingdom of France and a group from the Kingdom of England. It was held in 1381 at Vannes, the capital of the Duchy of Brittany at the time.

Occurring during the Caroline War of the Hundred Years' War, the tournament was a challenge made during the unsuccessful English siege of Nantes (1380–81). The competition took place after the siege had already ended. It had no military bearing but coincided with a change in Brittany's allegiance (the second Treaty of Guérande). It was an early example of a Franco-English sporting event. The English were commanded by Thomas of Woodstock, Earl of Buckingham at the time, the youngest child of King Edward III of England. The French knights' nominal leader, Louis II, Duke of Bourbon, was not present.

Two differing accounts of the contest exist, in Froissart's Chronicles and in a biography of Louis II. Individual combatants jousted standing with weapons against a single opponent, in turns. The French knights won the most jousts.

== Background ==
John IV, Duke of Brittany was exiled to England in 1373 but returned to power in 1379 when France attempted to confiscate Brittany. Breton cities such as Nantes remained hostile to the duke's English alliances. An English army marched on northern France via Calais, it laid waste to towns, and then besieged Nantes from November 1380 to January 1381, all without a battle with the French army.

The death of Charles V of France (September 1380) led the Duke of Brittany to seek to regain his subjects' favour through an alliance with France, now ruled by regents of the child king Charles VI. The duke did not join in the English siege, which was abandoned on 12 January 1381 due to outbreaks of starvation and dysentery among that army's soldiers. The English soldiers wintered in quarters at Vannes, Hennebont, Quimperlé or Quimpercorentain, "some here, and some there", whilst Brittany's barons secretly negotiated with France.

The tournament is recounted in two original sources. Jean Froissart's Chronicles, book 2, was written c. 1387 with help from unnamed witnesses, and is a wide-ranging historical document of this period in the war. The Chronicle of the Good Duke Louis of Bourbon is a later biography from 1429, written by Jean Cabaret d'Orville, (Note: Cabaret d'Orville is also named Jean d'Orronville "dit Cabaret [alias Cabaret]" in the French National Library's records) supervised by the leading French knight Jean de Châteaumorand, who competed at the tournament.

Vannes was usually known as Vennes in contemporary texts. (Note: Both Froissart and Cabaret d'Orville call the town Vennes, as does the English translator of Pontus and Sidonia c. 1450.)

== Tournament ==
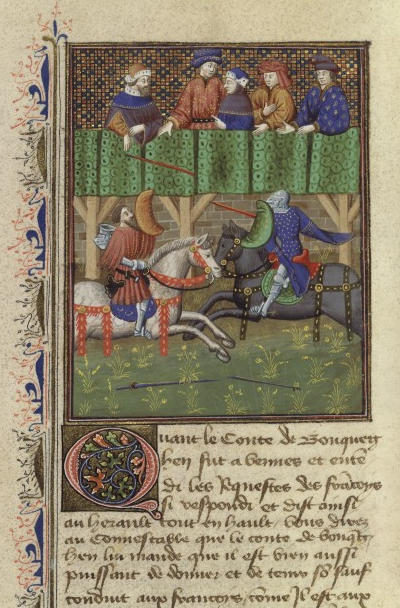
15th-century illustration of mounted jousting in the story; maybe depicting not Vannes, but Josselin, as horses weren't mentioned in the tournament (Note: Written accounts of this tournament say that the combatants jousted on foot. A joust does not necessarily involve horses.)

The challenge to fight was issued during the siege, or even earlier. According to Froissart, before the siege, jousts had first been suggested by Renaud de Thouars and the English Lord de Vertain, and by five other pairs of knights, at the Franco-English joust in 1380 between Gauvain Micaille and Joachim Cator. Further jousts were refused by Buckingham at that time, and by the governors in Nantes during the siege. However, after the siege, the Constable of France Olivier V de Clisson held two Franco-English jousts at Josselin Castle, "seven leagues from Vannes" (about 40 km):

Le Gallois d’Aunay and sir Hoyau d’Araines were the first to say they were ready to perform their engagement of three courses with the spear, on horseback [at Josselin]. When sir William Clinton and sir William France heard they were called upon by the French to perform their challenges, they were much rejoiced, and took leave of the earl and barons of England to go thither. They were accompanied by many knights and squires. The English and French tilted very handsomely, and performed their deeds of arms as the rules required.

This led Buckingham to propose a tournament at Vannes.

According to Cabaret d'Orville (1429), writing four decades later with Châteaumorand, 15 men of the Duke of Bourbon had challenged 15 of the besieging knights to a decisive battle on an island near Nantes. When the siege ended, this was apparently moved to Vannes. Cabaret d'Orville describes a highly formalized set of combats of 'fives': five men for each side, each fighting with "five spear thrusts, five sword thrusts, five axe thrusts, and five dagger thrusts". These numbers are probably allusions to the Combat of the Thirty in 1351 but have no resemblance to Froissart's version.

Tournaments famously took place in Vannes at the Place des Lices (Square of the Lists), though the Morbihan Polymathic Society argues that the marketplace, Place de l'Hôtel de Ville/Place Maurice-Marchais, was a likelier staging ground for that of 1381. Jean IV of Brittany heavily fortified Vannes in his reign. Both potential tournament areas were just outside Vannes' castle walls in 1381, but Place des Lices was inside them after the castle was enlarged later. Both are now public squares.

Froissart describes the combat at "a handsome space, which was large and even, on the outside of the town", and adds, "The French took their place at one end of the lists [tout d’un lés], and the English at the other." Lices or "lists" refer to "barriers or palisades enclosing a space of ground set apart for tilting".

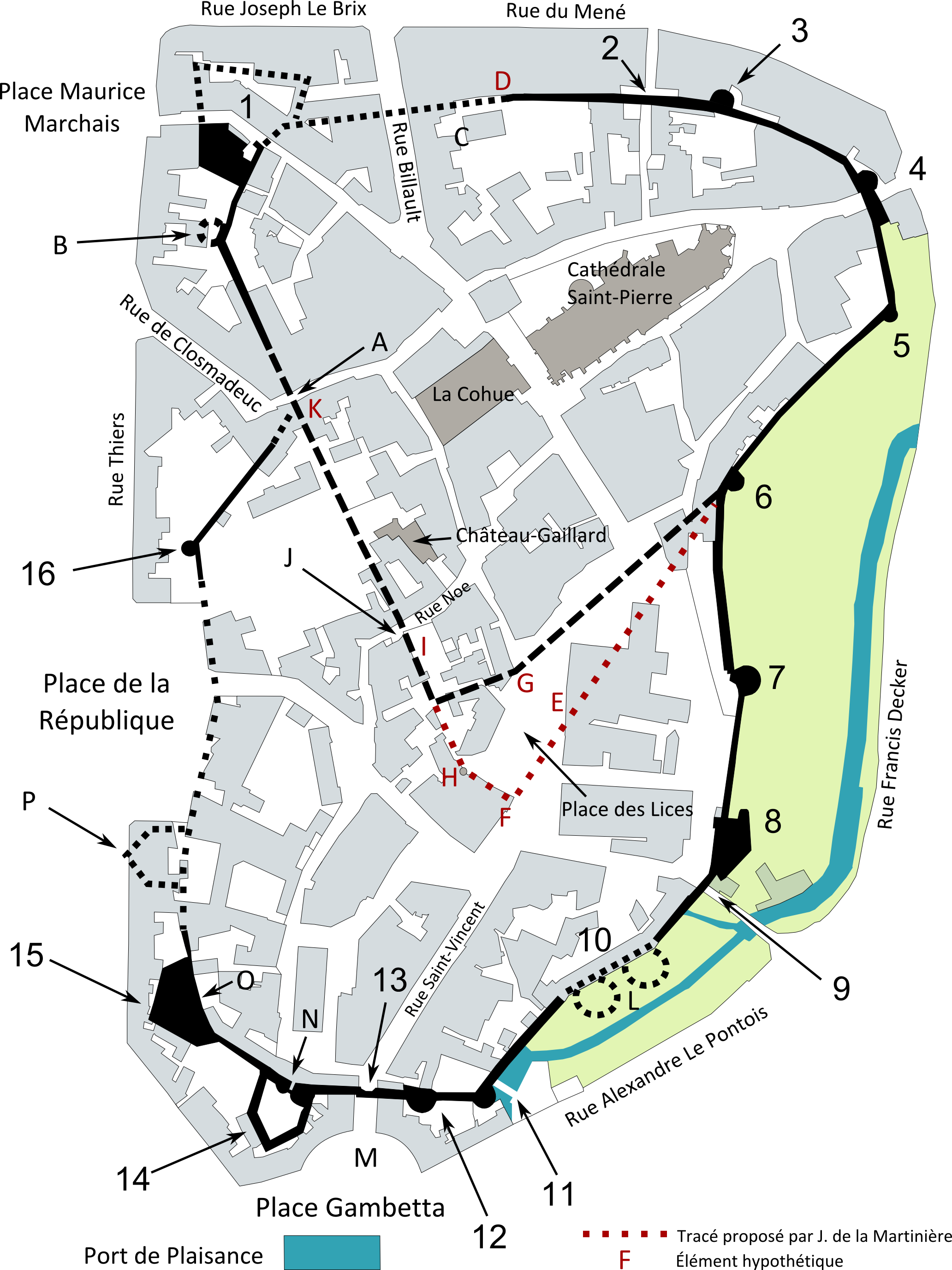
Map of the Vannes ramparts

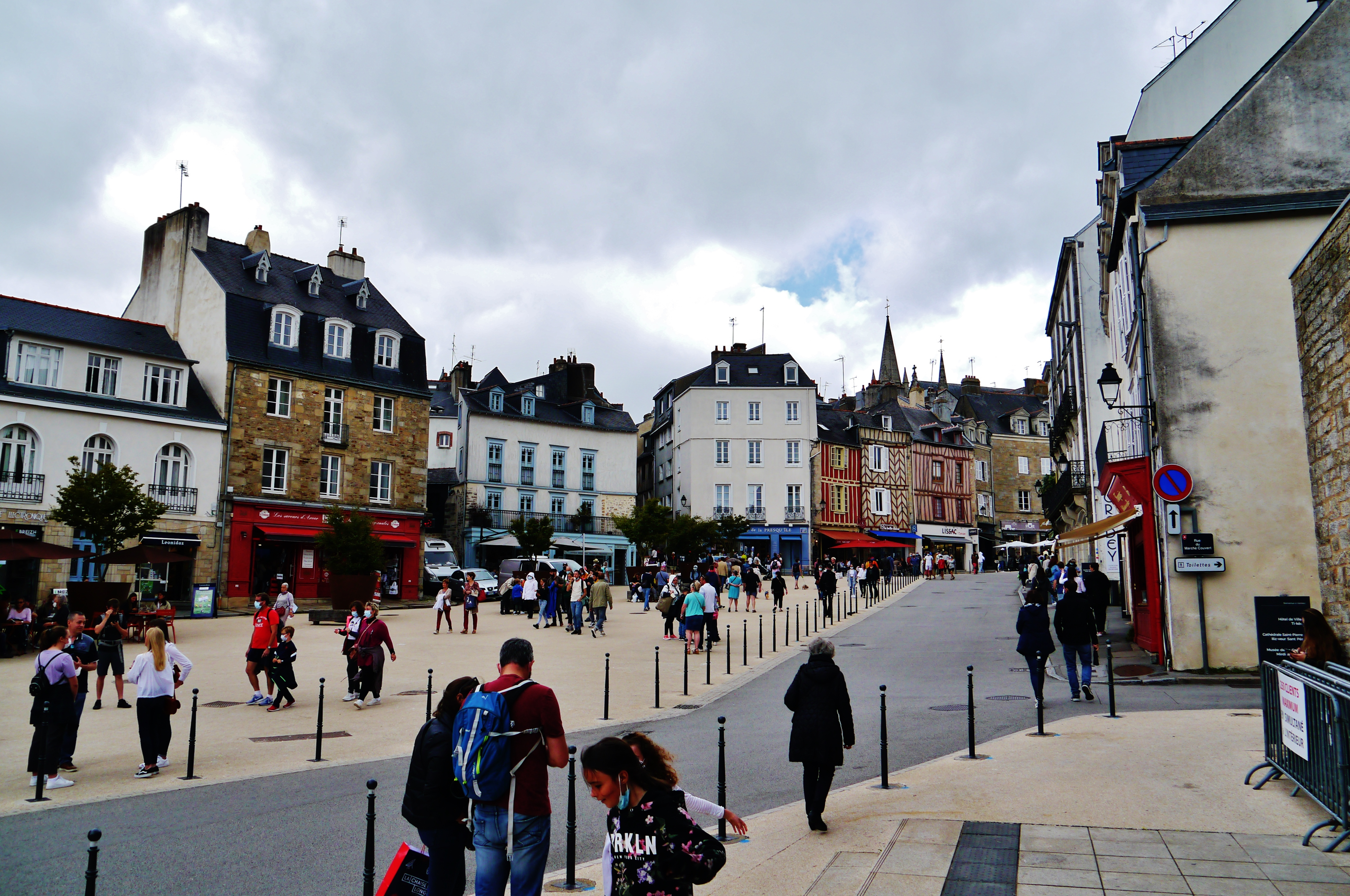
The modern Place des Lices in Vannes

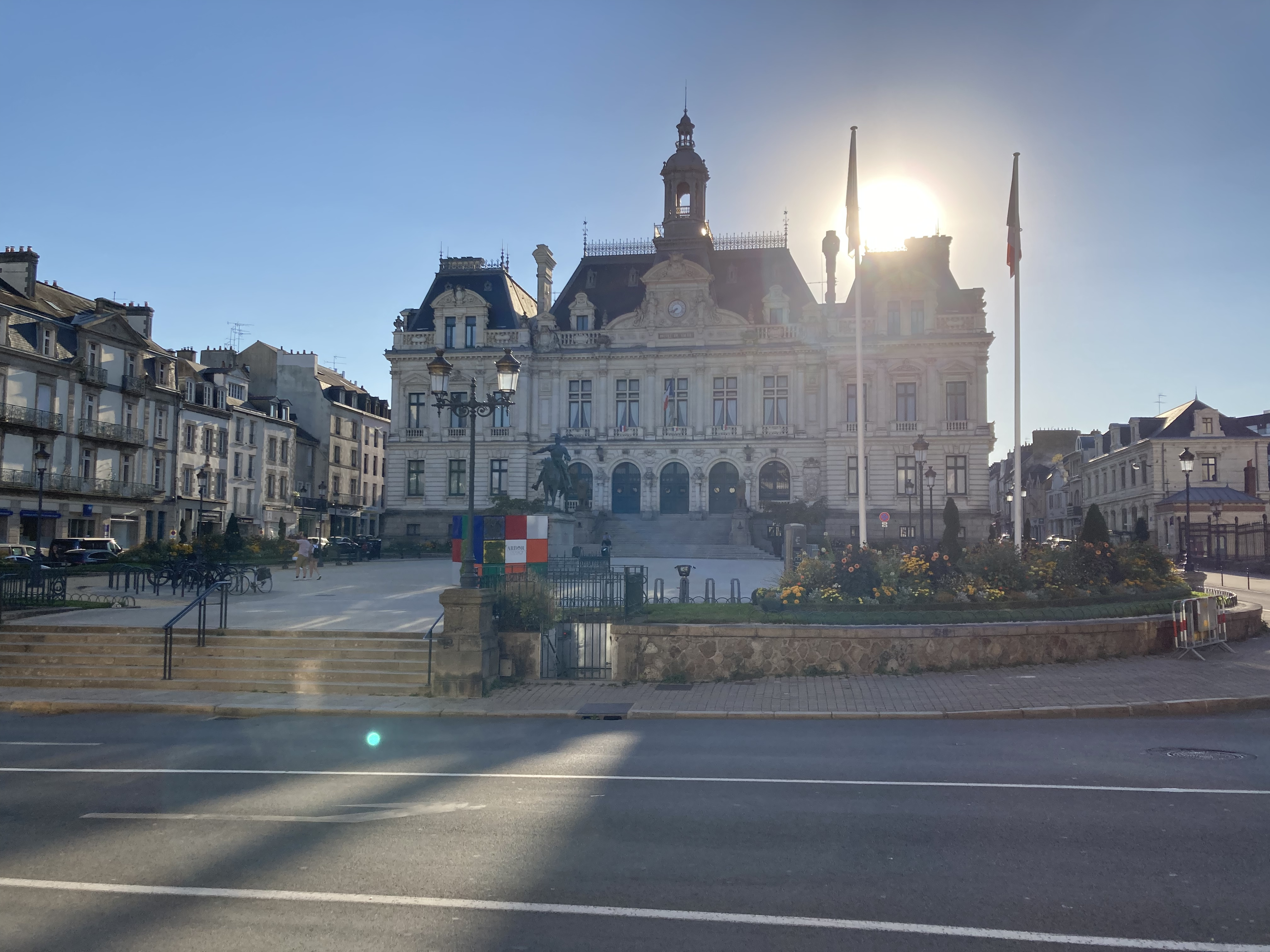
The modern Place Maurice-Marchais, another possible tournament ground

The knights' identities and the events of the joust differ markedly in the two accounts. Froissart (c. 1387) does not state that there were five jousts or five jousters, but writes that the English would replace a knight if he was dangerously outmatched.

The French knights in the Froissart's Chronicles version were: (Note: Some other stated namings and spellings include Reginald Thouars, the Lord de Pousanges, Jehan de Chastelmorand (in Cabaret's 1876 edition), Jehan de Châteaumorand, John de Chateaumorand, and John de Chatelmorant.)

- Renaud de Thouars, Lord (seigneur) of Pouzauges
- Tristan de la Jaille
- Clarius de Savoye
- Jean de Châteaumorand

English knights in Froissart's version of the tournament were: (Note: These are published Anglicized versions of the names; others include William Farringdon, Jankin Finchley and Jankin Clinton. Froissart's and others' Francized spellings include de Vertaing, d'Ambrecicourt, Janekins Setincelée [Finchley], Cloton, Gliton and Clichon [Clinton].)

- The Lord de Vertain
- Sir John d'Ambreticourt
- Edward Beauchamp
  - Jannequin Finchley (replacement)
- Jannequin Clinton
  - Sir William Farrington (replacement)

Only a few names or identities are the same in Cabaret d'Orville's account (1429).

The French knights in Cabaret's version were:

- Jean de Châteaumorand
- Le Barrois, Jean des Barres
- The Bastard of Glarains
- Tristan de la Jaille
- The Viscount of Aunay

English knights in Cabaret's version (Anglicized names where possible): (Note: Other Francized versions included Gautier Cloppeton, Édouard de Beauchamp and Cosselay.)

- Sir Walter Clopton
- Thomas de Hennefort (Note: Possibly 'of' Henford, Hednesford or Hanford; the Earls of Devon and Stafford were present in the campaign and tournament. As well as Cloppeton (Clopton), French sources spelled Bedford as Bedfort.)
- Edward Beauchamp
- Brisselai/Cosselai (Note: Perhaps due to different manuscripts, this figure has two quite different Francized names. Could be "Crosby", according to Froissart's English translator Thomas Johnes.)
- Sir John de Tracio (Note: Or "Jehan [Jean] de Traro" in the 1876 edition of Cabaret d'Orville. "Tracio" may be "Tracy" according to Johnes.)
  - Sir William Farrington purportedly fought a joust the next day

The Bastard of Glarains and Clarius de Savoye (Savoy) seem to be two names for the same person. La Jaille, Châteaumorand, Beauchamp and Farrington are obviously in both accounts. Froissart frequently acknowledges Le Barrois (Sir Barrois des Barres) in tales of the campaign, but does not record him having jousted. Logically, Cabaret's advisor Châteaumorand would remember fighting Walter Clopton, a name that appears elsewhere c. 1408–09; Froissart instead reports Châteaumorand's first opponent (with various spellings) as Jannequin Clinton.

=== Froissart version ===
The Vannetais and other traditional regions of Brittany, in north-western France

Froissart's account of the first jousts in the tournament at Vannes is summarized by Theodore Andrea Cook (in a chapter on Josselin Castle):

The lord of Vertain wounded the lord of Ponsanges very sorely. Sir John d’Ambreticourt and Sir Tristan de la Jaille fought without scathe. Then came the bout between a squire of Savoy, called the bastard Clarins, and Edward Beauchamp, son of Sir Robert Beauchamp. The Englishman proved too weak for the encounter, whereon Jankin Finchley took his place and stood to it valiantly. After this Sir John de Chatelmorant had a quarrel to settle with Jankin Clinton, squire of honour to the Duke of Buckingham, but again the Englishman proved too weak".

Jannequin Clinton was struck to the ground by Châteaumorand and was withdrawn by Buckingham's side. "The Englishman having retired, John de Chatelmorant said, 'Gentlemen, it seems your squire is too weak : choose another, I beg of you, more to your liking, that I may accomplish the deeds of arms I have engaged to perform ; for I shall be very disgracefully treated if I depart hence without having completed them." (from Froissart's Chronicles)

Sir William Farrington volunteered and suited up to face Châteaumorand.

Châteaumorand's injury is described thus by Froissart:

They advanced to each other with great courage, completely armed, the visor down and helmet tightly fixed on. John de Châtelmorant gave the knight such a blow on the helmet that sir William Farrington staggered some little, on account of his foot slipping: he kept his spear stiffly with both hands, and, lowering it by the stumble he made, struck John de Châtelmorant on the thigh; he could not avoid it; and the spear passed through and came out the length of one's hand on the other side. John de Châtelmorant reeled with the blow but did not fall.

The Chronicles depict it as a serious accident, immediately regretted:

The English knights were much enraged at this, and said, it was infamously done. The Englishman excused himself by saying, "he was extremely sorry for it: and if he had thought it would have so happened at the commencement of the combat, he would never have undertaken it: but that he could not help it, for his foot slipped from the violence of the blow he had received." Thus the matter was passed over. The French, after taking leave of the earl and other lords, departed, carrying with them John de Châtelmorant in a litter, to château Josselin, whence they had come, and where he was in great danger of his life from the effects of this wound.

Clephan's The Tournament (1919) summarizes it similarly, citing a previous joust: "Finally Châtelmorant fought with Sir William Farrington, the former receiving a dangerous wound in the thigh, for which the Englishman was greatly blamed, as being an infraction of the rules of the tourney; but an accident was pleaded as in the case of the duel between Gauvain Micaille and Joachim Cator. At this meeting the honours lay with the Frenchmen." Stuart Robertson names the incident as an example of the fierce conflicts and serious non-fatal injuries that were also seen as commonplace in Chaucer's "The Knight's Tale".

Froissart's writing was, particularly early in his career, a celebration of "the chivalric ethic of the heroic individual". The actions of most individuals in this account are presented as chivalrous and brave, perhaps to a suspicious degree, and participants are quick to try to rectify problems (the mismatched fights stopping for a replacement seems especially realistic). Overall, the account is the more plausible of the two, though the injury is a dramatic ending – the leading knight Châteaumorand taken away in a litter, seriously hurt.

=== Cabaret d'Orville version ===
Coat of arms of the family des Barres, of the knight Jean le Barrois

The Chronicle of the Good Duke Louis of Bourbon (1429) is "a lively and almost worshipful biography" of Louis II. It is also a chronicle of Bourbon military campaigns in Europe and in the Crusades, as remembered by Châteaumorand.

The book was written 48 years after the tournament, in March–May 1429, pivotal months in France's history. The historian, and translator of the book, Steven Muhlberger says: "The Chronicle might be seen as a tract for the times, as it depicts Duke Louis as precisely the kind of 'good duke' that France needed in 1429". The English Siege of Orléans was broken in May. Louis II's eldest grandson Charles had lost the Battle of the Herrings to the English in February.

This seems to colour the book's perspective. Some details are obviously imagined, such as a despondent meeting of English knights after losing Belleperche Castle to the Bourbons. With regard to the Tournament of Vannes, Muhlberger says, "Here is one place where the elderly soldier can be convicted of exaggeration" concerning what Châteaumorand wrote about his injury.

The tournament, in the version of Cabaret and Châteaumorand, is summarized by Johnes (1848):

In the histoire de la vie de Louis III. [sic, Louis II] duc de Bourbon, xliv. p. 160, five combatants are mentioned ; [...]

Sir John de Châtelmorant tilted with sir Walter Clopton, and wounded him so badly as to prevent the completing his engagement. Sir Barrois was opposed by Thomas de Hennefort, and these finished their career with lances unhurt; but sir Thomas was wounded too badly with the sword to continue it.

The bastard de Clairains vanquished Edward Beauchamp : he reeled so much, the English said he was drunk. Sir Tristan de la Jaille conquered his adversary. The viscount d’Aulnay had similar success.

A total victory for the French, according to Châteaumorand; quite unlike the version in Froissart, where two of the jousts were inconclusive or worse for the French knights.

Most outlandishly, Châteaumorand claims that William Farrington approached him at dinner that night to request a joust the following day; on their arrival at the tournament ground, Farrington wore no armour on his legs, claiming a knee injury, and he persuaded Châteaumorand to remove his own leg armour, before Farrington attacked Châteaumorand's leg in the joust. Farrington was taken prisoner by Buckingham and Brittany, according to Châteaumorand, who would be allowed any to take any ransom he desired. But in his account, Châteaumorand 'heroically' replied at length that he would not accept money because chivalry was its own reward. Châteaumorand instead accepted a gold goblet that Buckingham gifted out of admiration for him. Then, Châteaumorand told his men not to delay riding on, because he would be able to join them, despite him having an injury described as life-threatening both by Froissart and, in Châteaumorand's own account, by his own comrade Le Barrois.

Aside from alleging nefarious behaviour by Farrington, the Cabaret/Châteaumorand account makes claims that the English knights on the campaign were reluctant to fight and that they deliberately delayed the tournament, an unrealistic accusation to make about an overseas fighting force. Because France in 1429 was under a greater existential threat from the English, the events of 1380–1381 seem to be heightened in this account, and are presented in implausible ways compared to Froissart's version. Cabaret and Châteaumorand's contradictory and self-serving narrative of a crushing French victory has been widely accepted as historical fact by modern French commentators.

== After the tournament ==
The English army spent the rest of the winter in Brittany planning to mount new campaigns in spring. Froissart writes that some supplies arrived "from Cornwall, Guernsey and the Isle of Wight [...] otherwise they and their cavalry would have perished through famine."

Duke Jean IV of Brittany completed his agreement with France, the second Treaty of Guérande, severing his previous alliances with the English. He "humbled and excused himself" to the English party, knowing that he would have had to lose his duchy without placating the Breton people through a French alliance. The English army set sail for home from Vannes on "the eleventh day of April", 1381.

== In literature ==
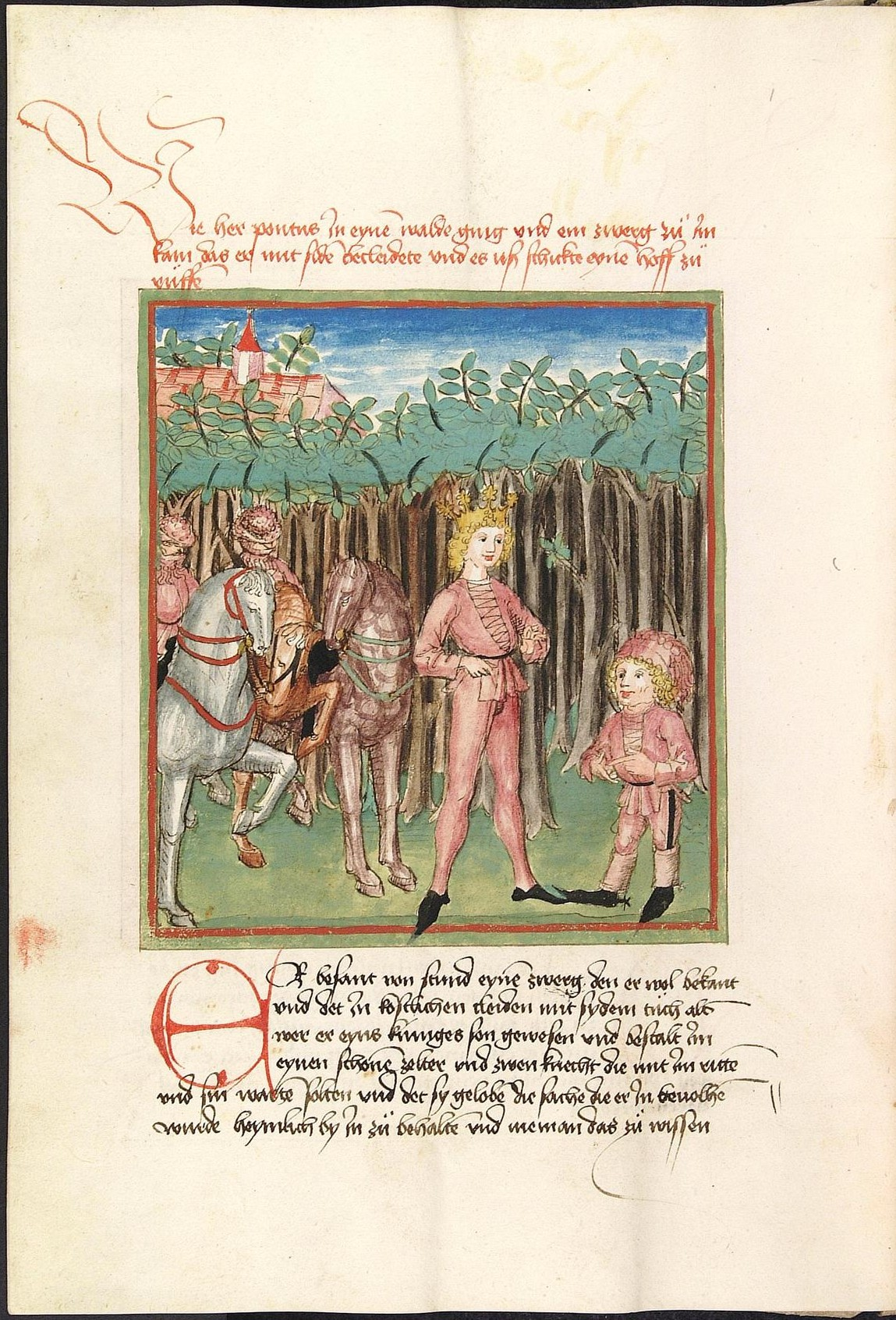
Illustration in a Pontus and Sidonia manuscript c. 1475

The medieval chivalric romance Pontus and Sidonia, composed around 20 years after the tournament, pays tribute to French and English nobles and to the events in Brittany with a "great tournament at Vannes" in the story – quoting from the Middle English translation c. 1450:

[Then] Ponthus called an heraude and made hym to crye that the whyte knyght with the [red rose] shall be this mondaye and tewesdaye in ye cyte of Vennes with fyue [five] felowes and hymselfe shall make the syxte for to withstande all maner of knyghtes with speres.

The story is set in Brittany and England, and features the Galician hero Pontus sailing to Vannes from England.
