= Gorce (surname) =

Gorce, La Gorce or de La Gorce is the surname of:

- Gabriel Gorce (born 1990), Spanish visually impaired para-alpine skier
- Gaëtan Gorce (born 1958), French politician
- Hervé Gorce (1952-2008), French footballer
- John Oliver La Gorce (1880-1959), American writer, explorer and President of the National Geographic Society
- Pierre de La Gorce (1846-1934), French magistrate, lawyer, historian and member of the Académie française
