= Gorse (disambiguation) =

Gorse is a genus of about 20 species of evergreen shrubs in the subfamily Faboideae of the pea family Fabaceae.

Gorse may also refer to:

- Georges Gorse (1915-2002), French politician and diplomat
- Gorse Trilogy, a series of novels by Patrick Hamilton
- Gorse (Aveyron), a hamlet in the commune (municipality) of Thérondels, department Aveyron, France.
- "Gorse", the entrance music for The Highlanders, a WWE tag team, from the WWE The Music, Vol. 7 album
- Gorses, a commune in the Lot department in south-western France.

== See also ==
- Gorse Hall
- Gorse Hill
- Gorce (disambiguation)
