= Vannes =

Prefecture and commune in Brittany, France

Vannes Gwened (Breton)
- Prefecture and commune
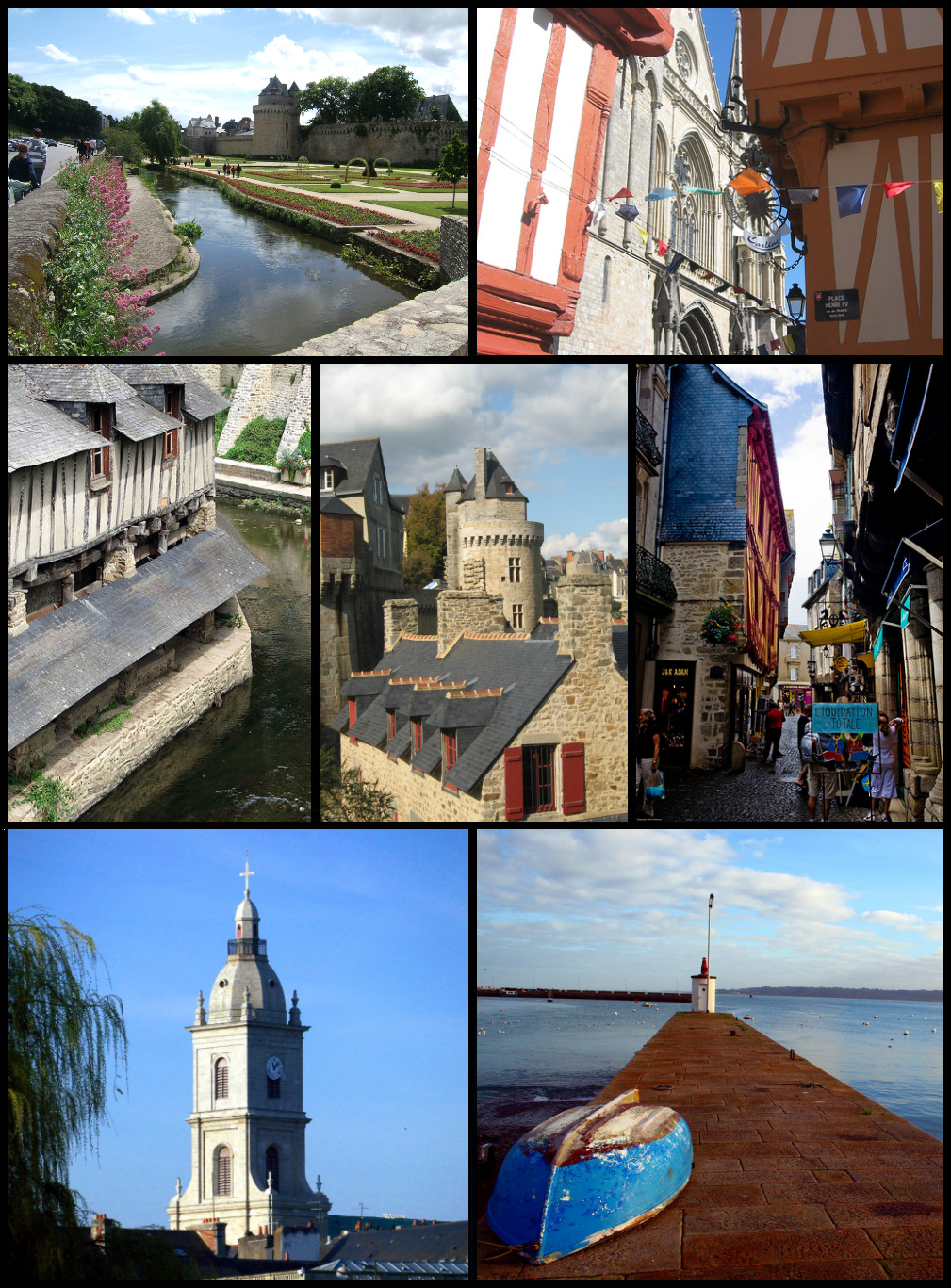
- Montage of Vannes; Top left: View of Ramparts Garden of Vannes and Gaillard Castle Museum; Top right: Saint Peter's Cathedral; Middle left: Vieux lavoirs, old washing place; Center: Connetable Tower; Middle right: Intra Muros narrow street; Bottom left: Saint Paterne Church; Bottom right: Conleau Pier

- Flag Coat of arms
- Location of Vannes
- Location within France Location within Brittany
- Coordinates: 47°39′21″N 2°45′37″W
- Country: France
- Region: Brittany
- Department: Morbihan
- Arrondissement: Vannes
- Canton: Vannes-1, 2 and 3
- Intercommunality: Golfe du Morbihan - Vannes Agglomération

Government
  - Mayor (2026–32): David Robo
- Area^{1}: 32.3 km^{2} (12.5 sq mi)
- Elevation: 22 m (72 ft)
- Highest elevation: 56 m (184 ft)
- Lowest elevation: 0 m (0 ft)
- Population (2023): 55,790
  - Density: 1,730/km^{2} (4,470/sq mi)
- Time zone: UTC+01:00 (CET)
  - Summer (DST): UTC+02:00 (CEST)
- INSEE/Postal code: 56260 /56000
- ^{1} French Land Register data, which excludes lakes, ponds, glaciers > 1 km^{2} (0.386 sq mi or 247 acres) and river estuaries.

Vannes (French pronunciation: [van]; Breton: Gwened, pronounced [ˈɡweːnet], [ˈɡɥeːnet]) is a commune in the French department of Morbihan, Brittany, northwestern mainland France. It was founded over 2,000 years ago.

== History ==
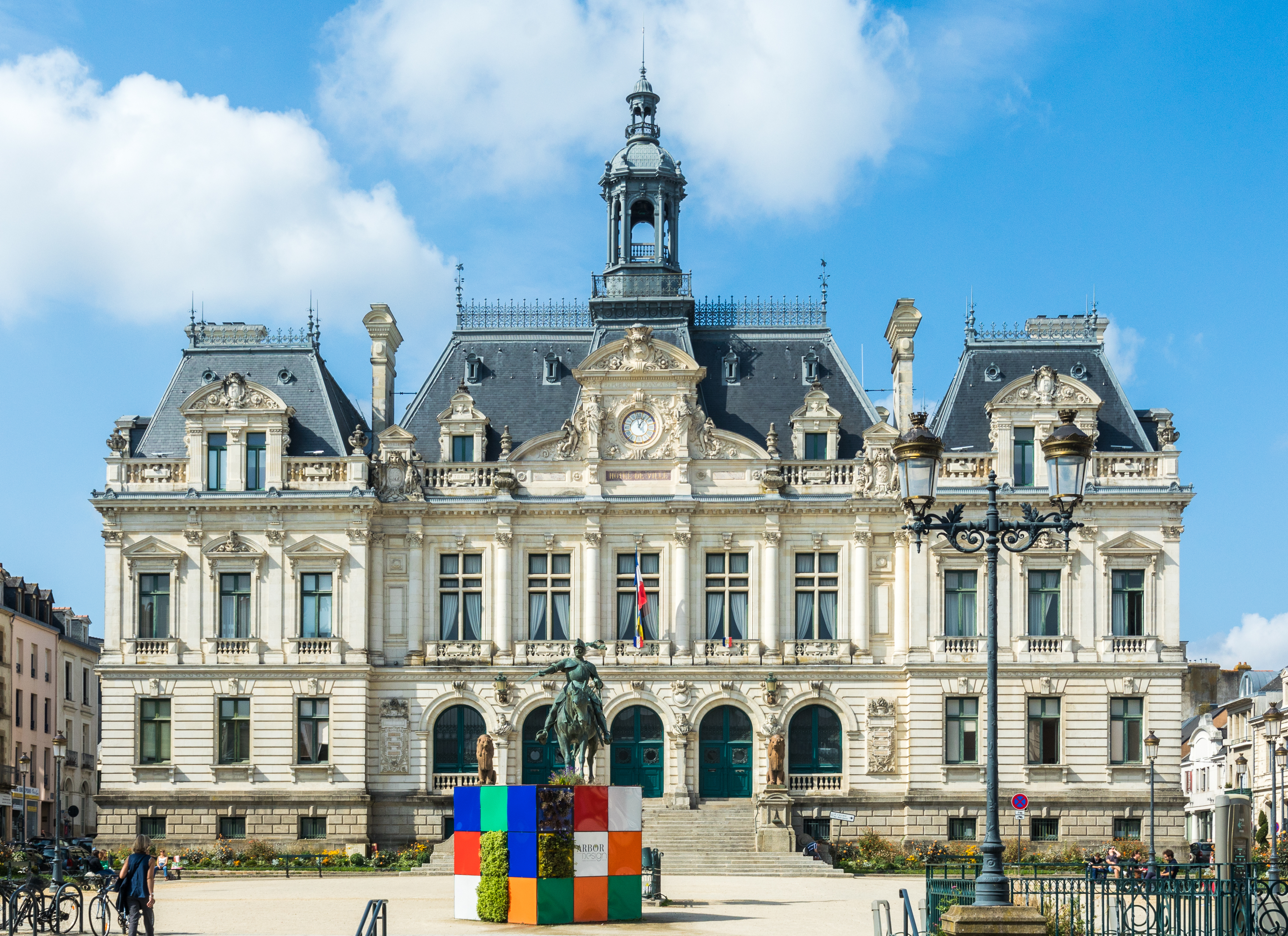
The Hôtel de Ville

=== Celtic Era ===
The name Vannes comes from the Veneti, a seafaring Celtic people who lived in the south-western part of Armorica in Gaul before the Roman invasions. The region seems to have been involved in a cross channel trade for thousands of years, probably using hide boats and perhaps Ferriby Boats. Wheat that apparently was grown in the Middle East was part of this trade. At about 150 BC the evidence of trade (such as Gallo-Belgic coins) with the Thames estuary area of Great Britain dramatically increased.

=== Roman Era ===
The Veneti were defeated by Julius Caesar's fleet in 56 BC in front of Locmariaquer; many of the Veneti were then either slaughtered or sold into slavery. The Romans settled a town called Darioritum in a location previously belonging to the Veneti. At the end of the 1st century BC, the Ramparts of Vannes were established as fortifications to protect the city during major crises.

=== The Britons arrive ===
From the 5th to the 7th century, the remaining Gauls were displaced or assimilated by waves of immigrant Britons who had been displaced by the Anglo-Saxons in Britain. Under the Breton name Gwened (also derived from the Veneti), the town was the center of an independent principality or kingdom variously called Bro-Wened ("Vannes") or Bro-Ereg ("land of Gwereg"), the latter for a prominent member of its dynasty, which claimed descent from Caradog Strongarm. The diocese of Vannes was erected in the 5th century. The Council of Vannes was held there in 461. The realm annexed Cornouaille for a time in the early 6th century but was permanently joined with Domnonia under its king and Saint Judicaël around 635.

=== Breton War of Succession ===
In 1342, Vannes was besieged four times between forces from both sides of the Breton War of Succession. The city's defending commander, Olivier IV de Clisson, was captured by the English but finally released. The French eventually executed him since they suspected him of being a traitor since the ransom was unusually low.

=== 14th–17th centuries ===
Vannes was the capital of the duchy of Brittany in the 14th and 15th centuries. Duke Arthur II was entombed there, and Duke John IV "the Conqueror" heavily fortified the city and the Ramparts. The Franco–English Tournament of Vannes took place in 1381. Both John V and Francis I were born in Vannes at the Château de l'Hermine.

The appellate court the Parlement of Brittany at Vannes was made a sovereign court in 1485 by Duke Francis II but was soon subordinated to the royal Paris courts. After 1553 it moved to Nantes and Rennes. It returned to Vannes from 1675 to 1690, causing a significant influx of wealthy residents, their servants, and their suppliers.

The Court of Auditors of Brittany was established in Vannes in the 13th century, and remained there until 1491, when it moved to Nantes due to the personal union of Anne of Brittany and Charles VIII.

=== 18th century ===
In 1759, Vannes was used as the staging point for a planned French invasion of Britain. A large army was assembled there, but it was never able to sail after the French naval defeat at the Battle of Quiberon Bay in November 1759.

In 1795, during the French Revolution, French forces based in Vannes successfully repelled a planned British-Royalist invasion through Quiberon.

=== 19th century ===
The Hôtel de Ville was completed in 1886.

== Geography ==
Vannes, located on the Gulf of Morbihan at the mouth of two rivers, the Marle and the Vincin, is around 100 kilometres (62 miles) northwest of Nantes and 450 kilometres (280 miles) south west of Paris. Vannes is a market town linked to the sea.

=== Climate ===
Climate data for Vannes / 1991–2020 normals, extremes 1998–present
Month	Jan	Feb	Mar	Apr	May	Jun	Jul	Aug	Sep	Oct	Nov	Dec	Year
Record high °C (°F)	16.7 (62.1)	20.2 (68.4)	23.7 (74.7)	27.1 (80.8)	29.9 (85.8)	36.0 (96.8)	40.2 (104.4)	38.3 (100.9)	32.7 (90.9)	29.8 (85.6)	20.6 (69.1)	16.9 (62.4)	40.2 (104.4)
Mean daily maximum °C (°F)	9.9 (49.8)	10.7 (51.3)	13.3 (55.9)	16.1 (61.0)	18.9 (66.0)	22.1 (71.8)	23.9 (75.0)	23.6 (74.5)	21.9 (71.4)	17.5 (63.5)	13.3 (55.9)	10.5 (50.9)	16.8 (62.2)
Daily mean °C (°F)	6.8 (44.2)	7.1 (44.8)	9.1 (48.4)	11.4 (52.5)	14.3 (57.7)	17.3 (63.1)	19.0 (66.2)	18.7 (65.7)	16.7 (62.1)	13.6 (56.5)	9.7 (49.5)	7.3 (45.1)	12.6 (54.7)
Mean daily minimum °C (°F)	3.7 (38.7)	3.5 (38.3)	4.8 (40.6)	6.6 (43.9)	9.7 (49.5)	12.6 (54.7)	14.2 (57.6)	13.7 (56.7)	11.5 (52.7)	9.7 (49.5)	6.2 (43.2)	4.1 (39.4)	8.4 (47.1)
Record low °C (°F)	−7.4 (18.7)	−7.3 (18.9)	−8.6 (16.5)	−3.2 (26.2)	−0.6 (30.9)	3.7 (38.7)	7.0 (44.6)	6.2 (43.2)	2.5 (36.5)	−1.5 (29.3)	−5.8 (21.6)	−7.1 (19.2)	−8.6 (16.5)
Average precipitation mm (inches)	99.8 (3.93)	77.0 (3.03)	70.1 (2.76)	66.0 (2.60)	54.0 (2.13)	48.4 (1.91)	51.2 (2.02)	57.4 (2.26)	56.3 (2.22)	101.7 (4.00)	101.1 (3.98)	116.0 (4.57)	899.0 (35.39)
Average precipitation days (≥ 1.0 mm)	14.5	11.0	10.7	9.7	8.8	7.6	7.8	8.6	7.4	12.5	12.6	13.8	125.0
Mean monthly sunshine hours	74.5	106.8	156.9	201.4	222.0	244.3	254.5	225.1	202.0	120.9	93.2	79.4	1,980.8
Source: Meteociel

== Transport ==
Train
The Vannes railway station offers connections to Quimper, Rennes, Nantes, Paris and several regional destinations.
With the fast train TGV, the journey takes:
– 30 minutes to Lorient,
– 1 hour to Nantes or Rennes,
– 2.5 to 4 hours to Paris.
The Transport express régional or TER is a slower train to join railway stations in the close neighborhood, such as Auray or Questembert.
There is no direct line from Vannes to Saint-Brieuc (118 km away in the north of Brittany), so the train from Vannes to Saint Brieuc goes via Rennes, which doubles the travel time and cost: it takes 2 to 3 hours to go from Vannes to Saint Brieuc by train.

Car
Two highways, in the north of Vannes, provide fast connections by car:
– N165: west to Lorient (58 km) and Quimper (122 km), south east to Nantes (111 km)
– N166: north east to Rennes (113 km)
+ a network of small roads connects Vannes to smaller cities. There is no highway from Vannes to Saint-Brieuc, so the way to northern Brittany consists of small roads. The lack of highway or railway between Vannes and Saint-Brieuc (118 km north) cuts the communications between northern and southern Brittany, and limits Brittany economic performance.

Airplanes
Vannes has a small airfield in the village of Monterblanc, called Vannes-Meucon airport, or "Vannes – Golfe du Morbihan airport". It used to be a military airport, but it is now dedicated to general aviation aircraft. It belongs to Vannes Agglomeration community, the group of cities gathered around Vannes, and the main users of this airfield are Vannes flying club, the local ultralight aviation club, and Vannes school of skydiving.

Bus
There are 2 bus networks in Vannes: – Kicéo, proposes short travels starting from Vannes Place de la République on behalf of Vannes Agglomeration community,
– CAT, propose longer travel starting from the railway station on behalf of Morbihan.
So there are 2 central bus stations in Vannes: one on Place de la Libération, the other at the railway station.

Bike
Vannes has a public bicycle rental program, called Vélocéo based on the same idea as the Paris Vélib'. Hundreds of bicycles are available across 10 automated rental stations each with 10 to fifteen bikes/spaces. Each Vélocéo service station is equipped with an automatic rental terminal and stands for bicycles. This replaces the Velocea service, which was discontinued in August 2017.

== Population ==
Inhabitants of Vannes are called Vannetais.

Historical population

Year	Pop.	±% p.a.
1793	9,131	—
1800	9,131	+0.00%
1806	10,902	+3.00%
1821	11,289	+0.23%
1831	10,395	−0.82%
1836	11,623	+2.26%
1841	11,737	+0.20%
1846	12,974	+2.02%
1851	12,356	−0.97%
1856	14,329	+3.01%
1861	14,564	+0.33%
1866	14,560	−0.01%
1872	14,690	+0.15%
1876	17,946	+5.13%
1881	19,284	+1.45%
1886	20,036	+0.77%
1891	21,504	+1.42%
1896	22,189	+0.63%
1901	23,375	+1.05%

Year	Pop.	±% p.a.
1906	23,561	+0.16%
1911	23,748	+0.16%
1921	21,402	−1.03%
1926	22,089	+0.63%
1931	22,413	+0.29%
1936	24,068	+1.44%
1946	28,189	+1.59%
1954	28,403	+0.09%
1962	30,411	+0.86%
1968	36,576	+3.12%
1975	40,359	+1.42%
1982	42,178	+0.63%
1990	45,644	+0.99%
1999	51,759	+1.41%
2007	52,984	+0.29%
2012	52,648	−0.13%
2017	53,352	+0.27%
2023	55,790	+0.75%

Source: EHESS and INSEE (1968–2023)

== Monuments and sights ==
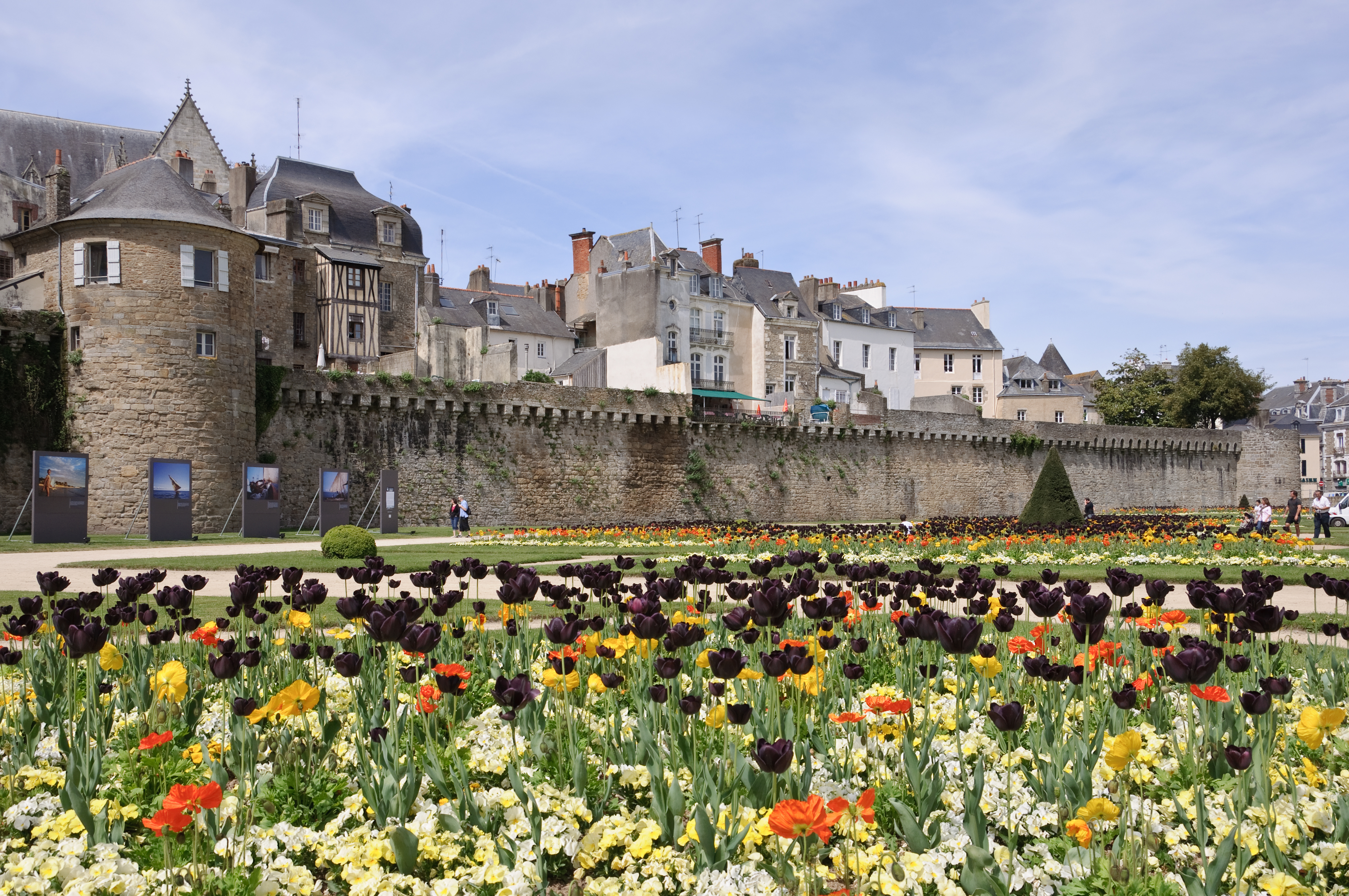
City walls of Vannes

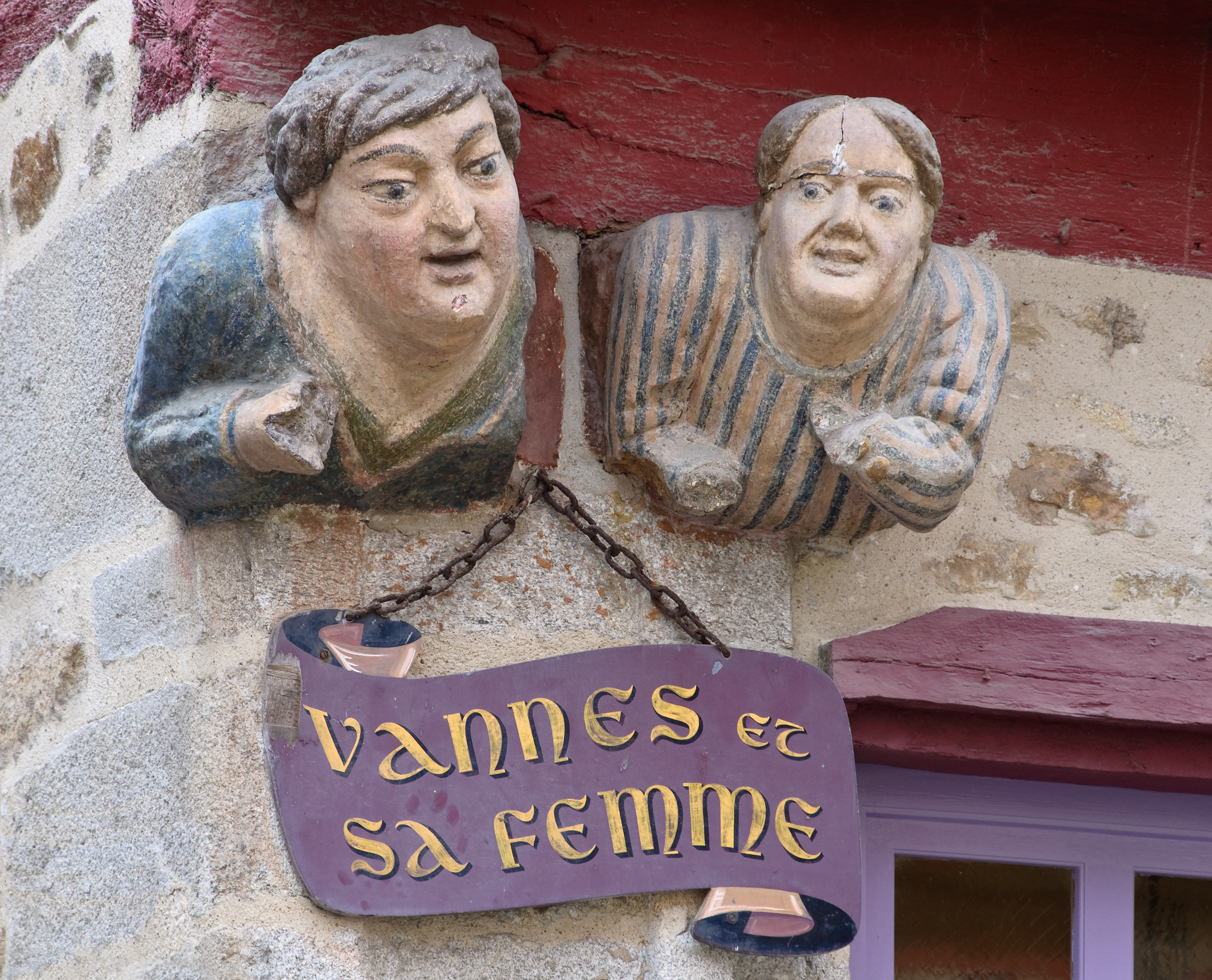
"Vannes and his wife"

Vannes: timber-framed houses in Place Henri-IV

Cathedral of St Peter, Gothic cathedral

- Church of St Patern, classic church
- Chapel of Saint-Yves, baroque church
- Château Gaillard (medieval house now used as an archaeological museum)
- Musée de la Cohue (fine arts museum)
- Hôtel de Ville
- Old city walls, which include:
  - Tour du Connétable (a large medieval tower part of the old city walls)
  - Château de l'Hermine (former castle, transformed into a palace in the 17th century, and a residence of the Dukes of Brittany between the 13th and 16th centuries)
  - Porte Calmont, medieval city gate
  - Porte Prison, medieval city gate
  - Porte Poterne, medieval city gate
  - Porte Saint-Jean, medieval city gate
- Porte Saint-Vincent, 18th century city gate
- Many timber-framed houses in the old town
- "Vannes and his wife", a painted granite sculpture from the 15th century in front of Château Gaillard
- The harbour

== Education ==
- École nationale supérieure d'ingénieurs de Bretagne Sud
- Institut catholique d'arts et métiers
- Southern Brittany University

=== Breton language ===
The municipality launched a linguistic plan through Ya d'ar brezhoneg on 12 October 2007. In 2008, 7.71% of children attended the bilingual schools in primary education.

== In fiction ==
- In the last of the Three Musketeers novels of Alexandre Dumas, The Vicomte of Bragelonne: Ten Years Later, published in 1847, the musketeer Aramis appears as bishop of Vannes before becoming General of the Society of Jesus.
- In Sébastien Roch, a novel by Octave Mirbeau published in 1890, Sebastien is sent to a school in Vannes, Saint-François-Xavier, where he is a victim of sexual abuse.
- In Sir Nigel, a novel by Sir Arthur Conan Doyle published in 1906, Nigel is made seneschal of the Castle of Vannes after a battle in Brittany. He does not remain in Vannes, since after winning in another battle, the Black Prince dubs him a knight and Nigel returns to England to wed the Lady Mary.
- Jean-François Parot has written a series of crime fictions printed up to 2010 taking place in the 18th century, whose main character is Nicolas Le Floch, a Police Commissioner who was also educated in the school of Saint François-Xavier in Vannes, but he didn't share Sebastien Roch's misfortune. The Nicolas Le Floch novels have been adapted as a television series.
- In The Secret of the Missing Boat, a children's book by Paul Berna published in 1966 as La Voile Rouge.
- Mabel Esther Allan's book Balconies and Blue Nets documents the life of a schoolgirl attending holiday school in Vannes.

== Notable people from Vannes ==
- Albinus of Angers (born 469), Roman Catholic saint
- Saint Emilion (Emilianus) (?–767), monk and Roman Catholic saint, he gave his name to one of the main red wine areas of Bordeaux
- François I (1414–1450), Duke of Brittany
- Louis-Marie Autissier (1772–1830), painter
- Armand Alexandre de Castagny (1807–1900), military general
- Pierre de La Gorce (1846–1934), historian
- Paul César Helleu (1859–1927), painter
- Émile Jourdan (1860–1931), painter of Pont-Aven School
- Louis Martin-Chauffier (1894–1980), writer, journalist and member of the French Resistance
- Yves Rocard (1903–1992), physicist
- Colonel Rémy (1904–1984), secret agent of the French Resistance
- Alain Resnais (1922–2014), film director
- Jean Vezin (1933–2020), palaeographer
- Yves Coppens (1934–2022), paleontologist
- Serge Latouche (born 1940), economist
- Cédric Morgan (born 1943), writer, winner of the Prix Breizh in 2015
- Claude-Michel Schönberg (born 1944), singer and songwriter
- Bernard Poignant (born 1945), politician
- Hélène de Fougerolles (born 1973), actress
- Mathieu Berson (born 1980), footballer
- Yann Kermorgant (born 1981), footballer
- Joris Marveaux (born 1982), footballer
- Sylvain Marveaux (born 1986), footballer
- Julian Chartier (born 1999), gymnast

== Sport ==
Rugby Club Vannes is a professional rugby union club currently competing in the Top 14 competition, the highest level of the French domestic championship. In the 2024-25 season they have gained automatic qualification for the European Professional Club Rugby Challenge Cup

The local football team is Vannes OC, who play in the 5th tier Championnat National 2 as of the 2023–24 season.

Both teams play at the Stade de la Rabine built in 2001.

The town was the start line for stage 9 of the 2015 Tour de France.

== Twin towns – sister cities ==
Vannes is twinned with:

- Mons, Belgium (1952)
- Cuxhaven, Germany (1963)
- Fareham, England, United Kingdom (1967)
- Wałbrzych, Poland (2001)
- Ballymoney, Northern Ireland, United Kingdom (2001)

== See also ==
- Saint-Vincent Gate (Vannes)
- Veneti (Gaul)
- Saint Meriasek
- Operation Dingson
- Communes of the Morbihan department
- Pierre Marie François Ogé Sculpture in Vannes town hall.
- Eleanor, a Nile crocodile resident of the Aquarium du Vannes.

== Gallery ==
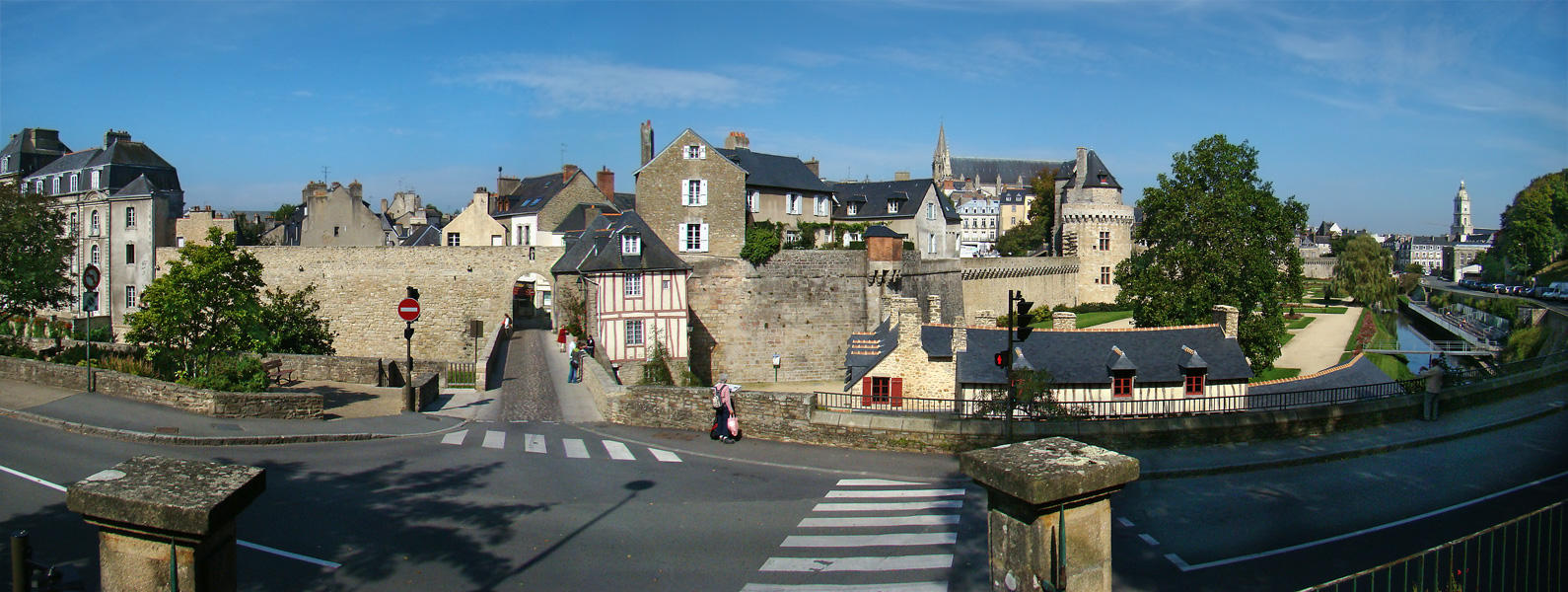
Panorama of the old town

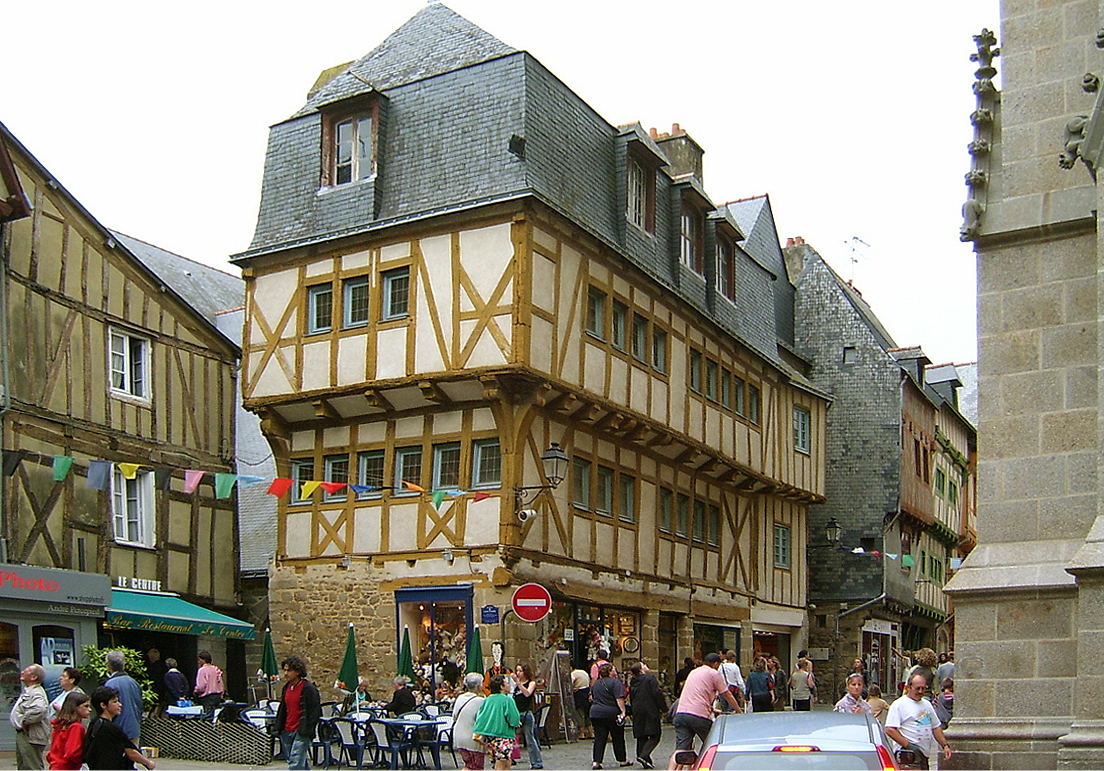
In the old town centre

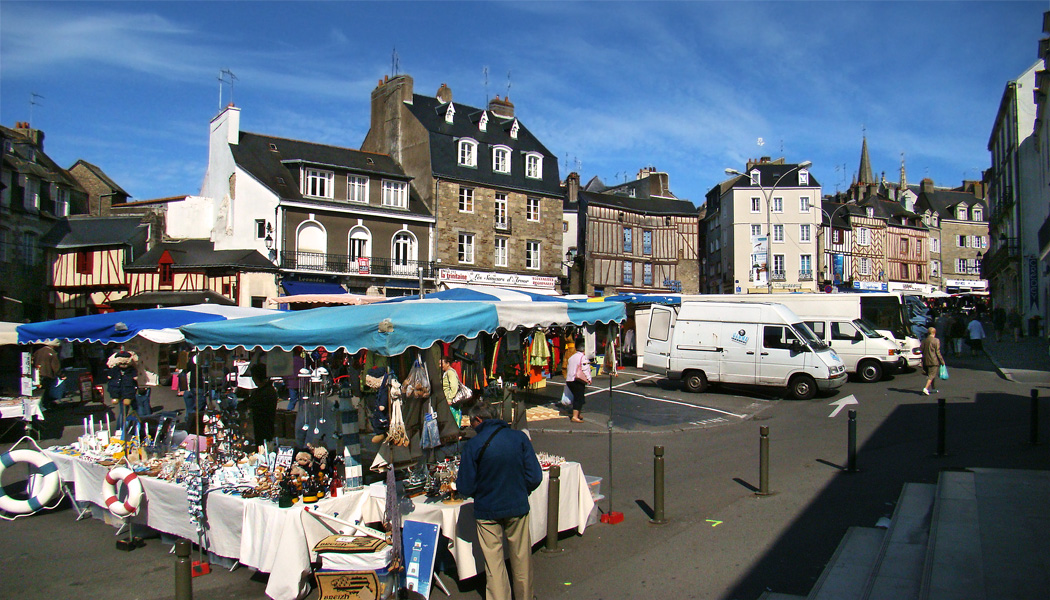
Place des Lices

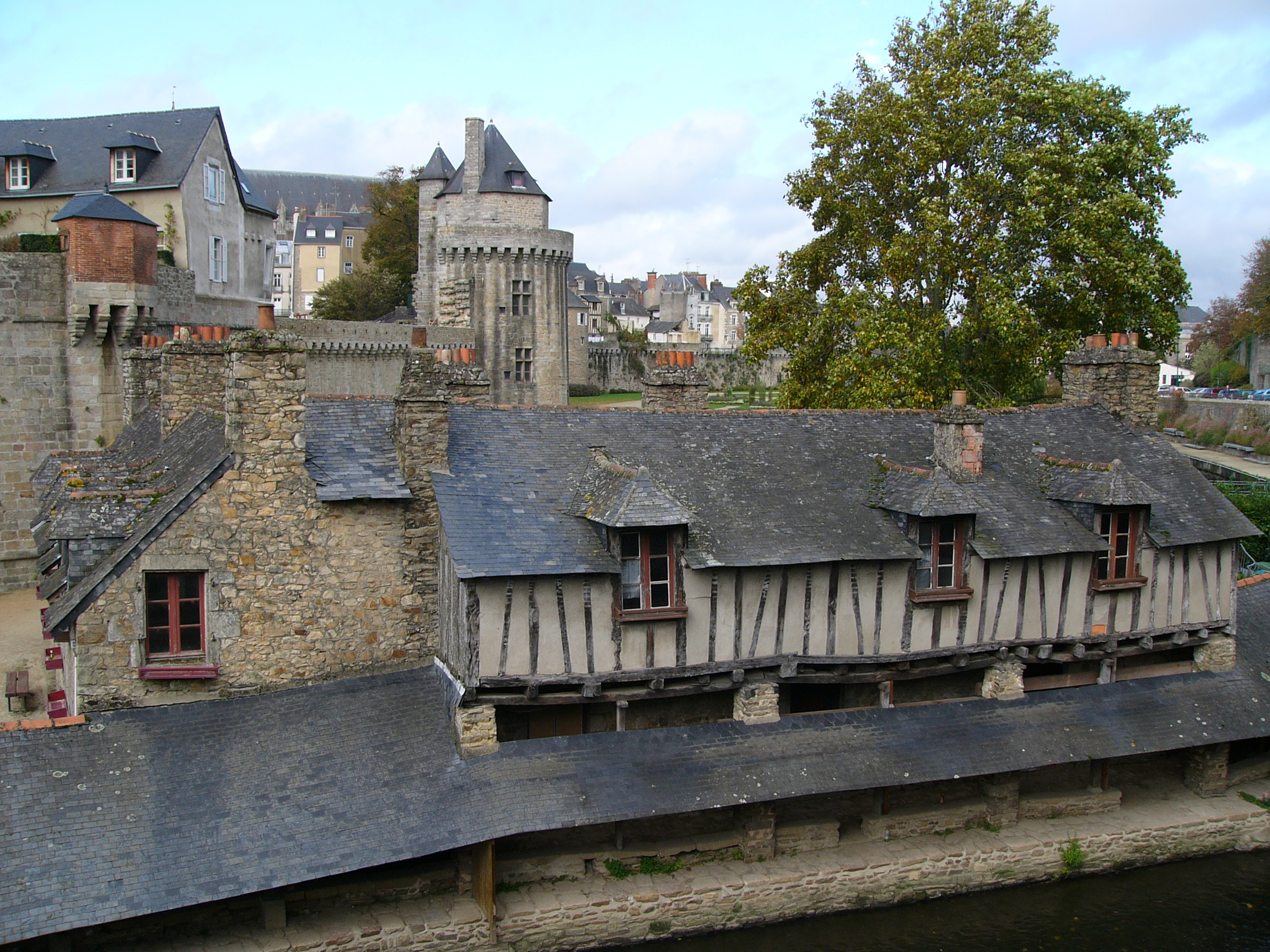
Old washing-places

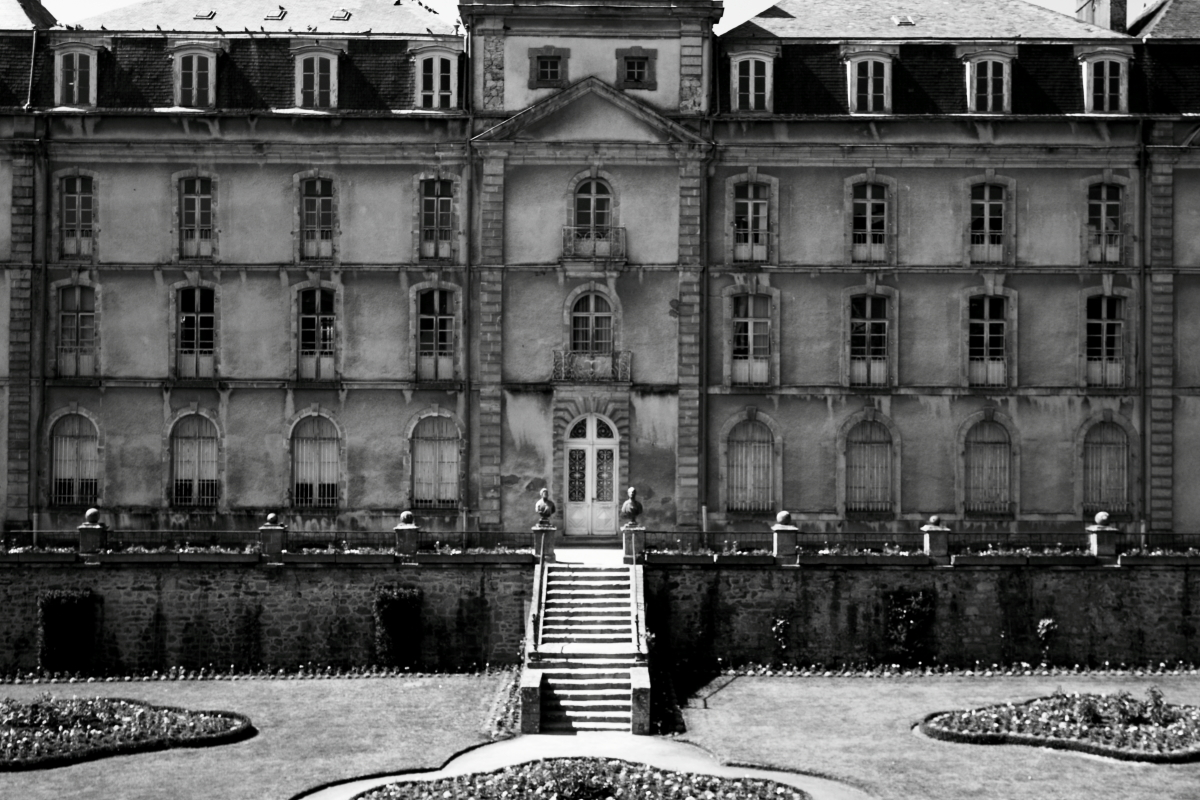
Château de l'Hermine

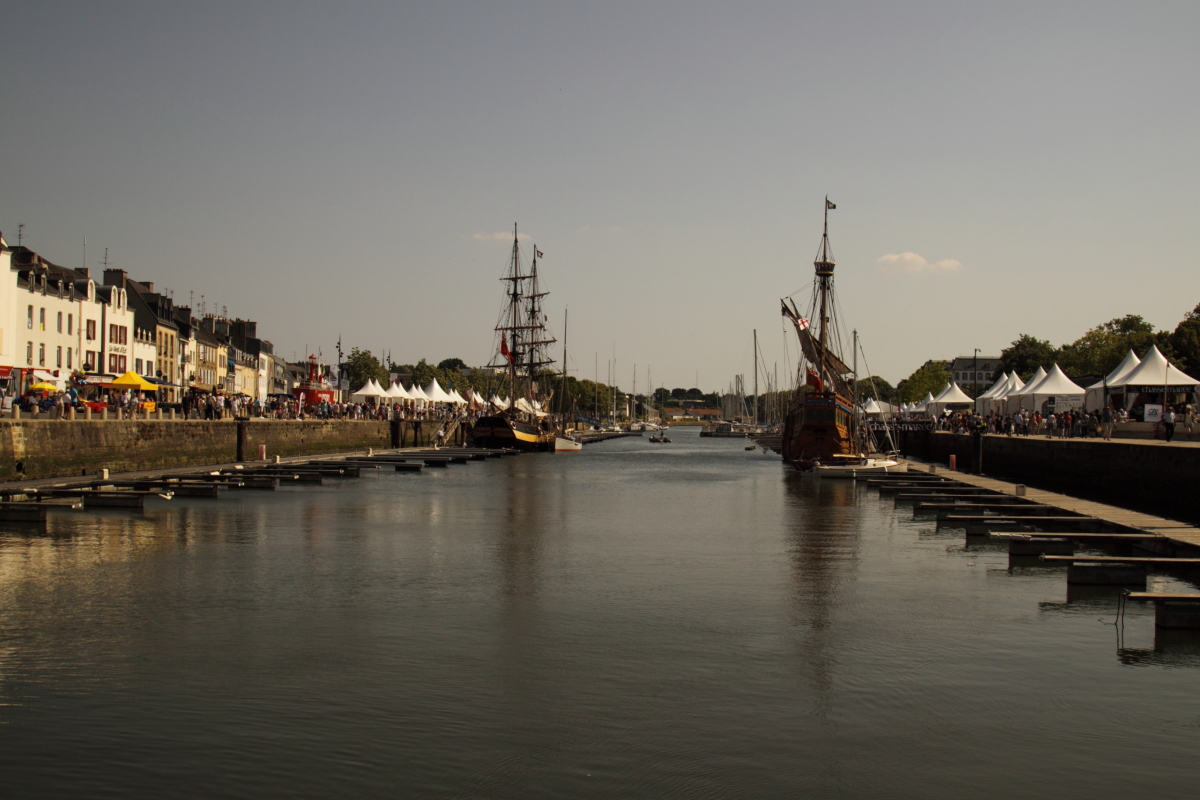
Port de Vannes

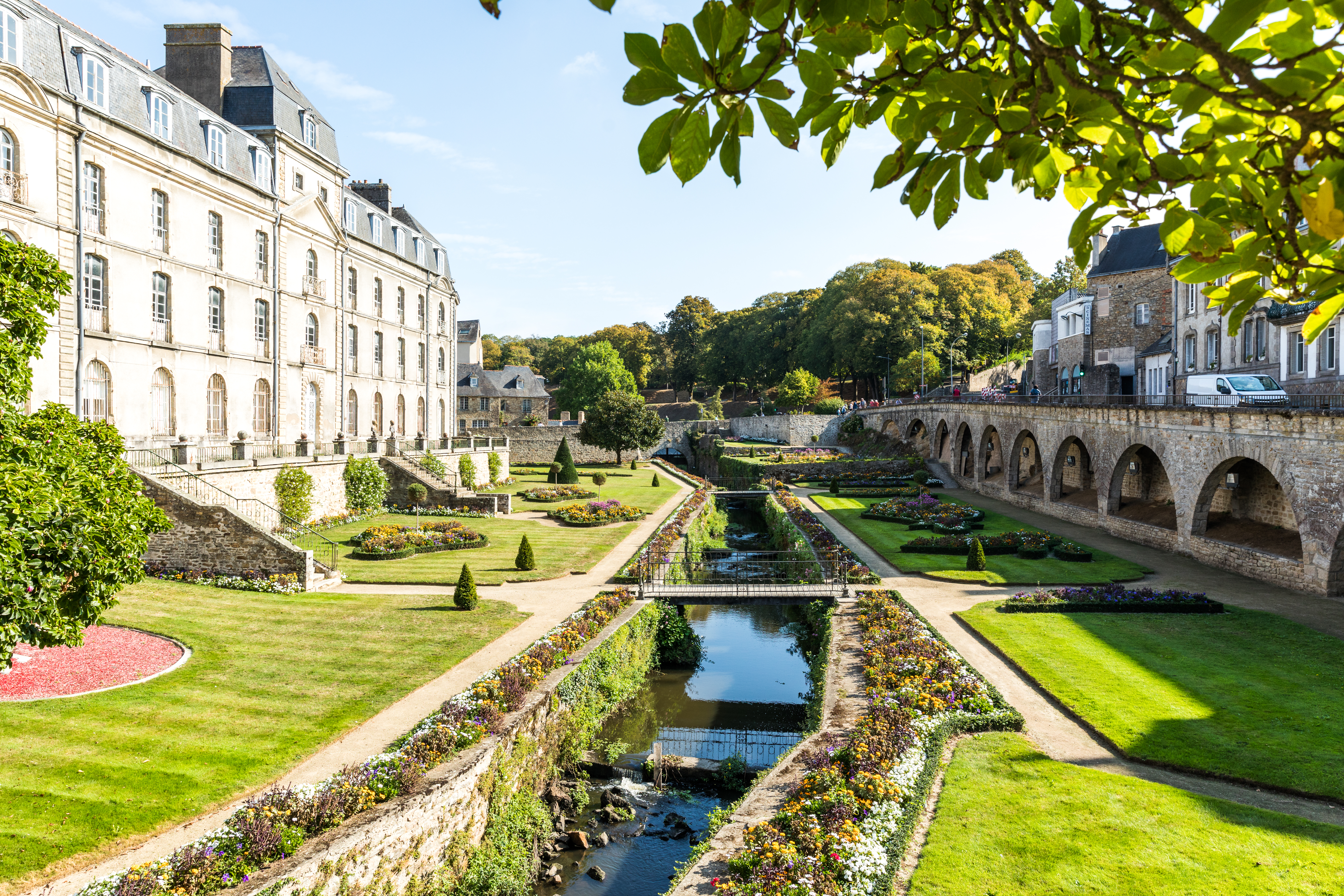
Garden of the Château de l'Hermine

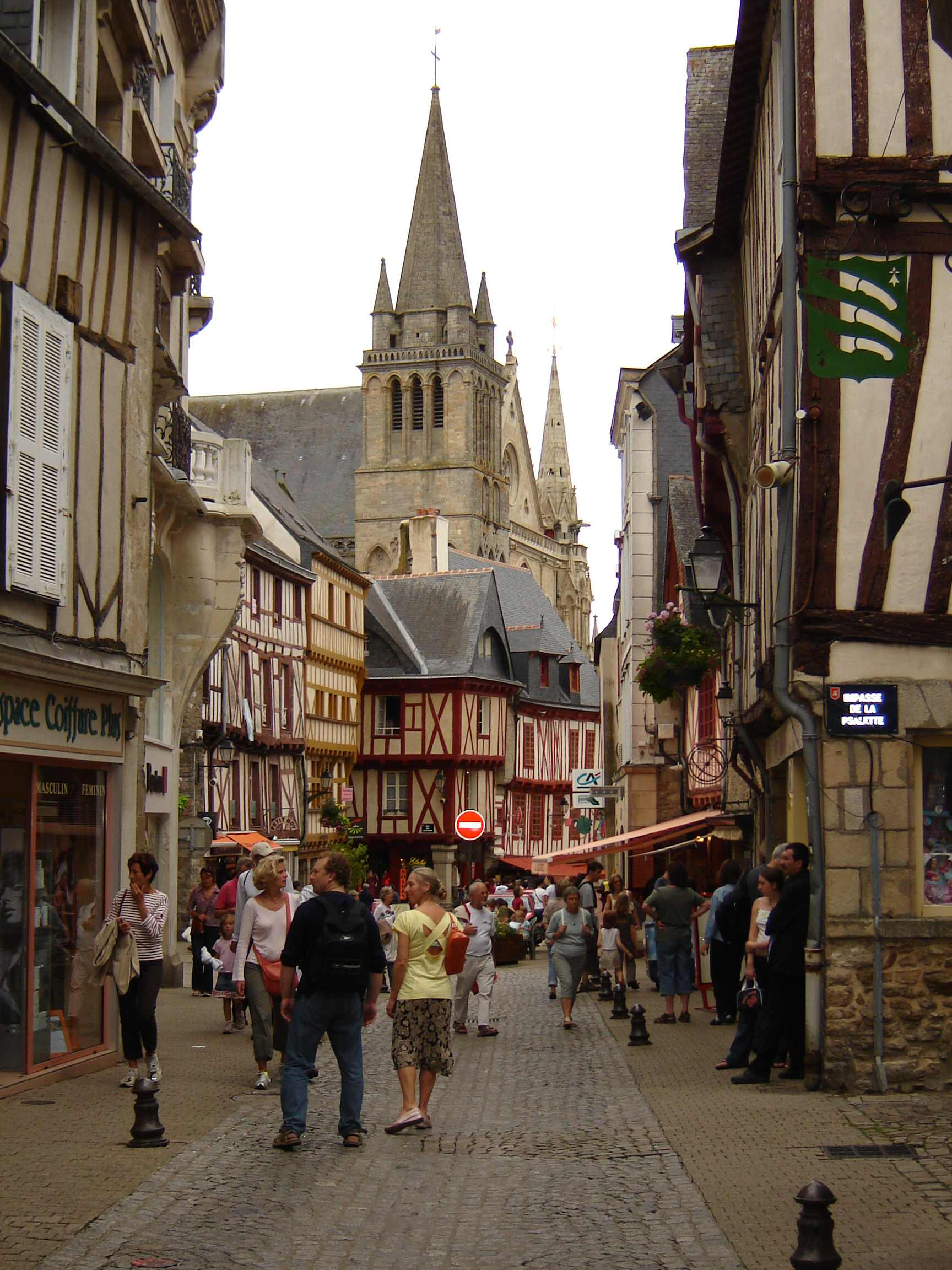
Street in town center

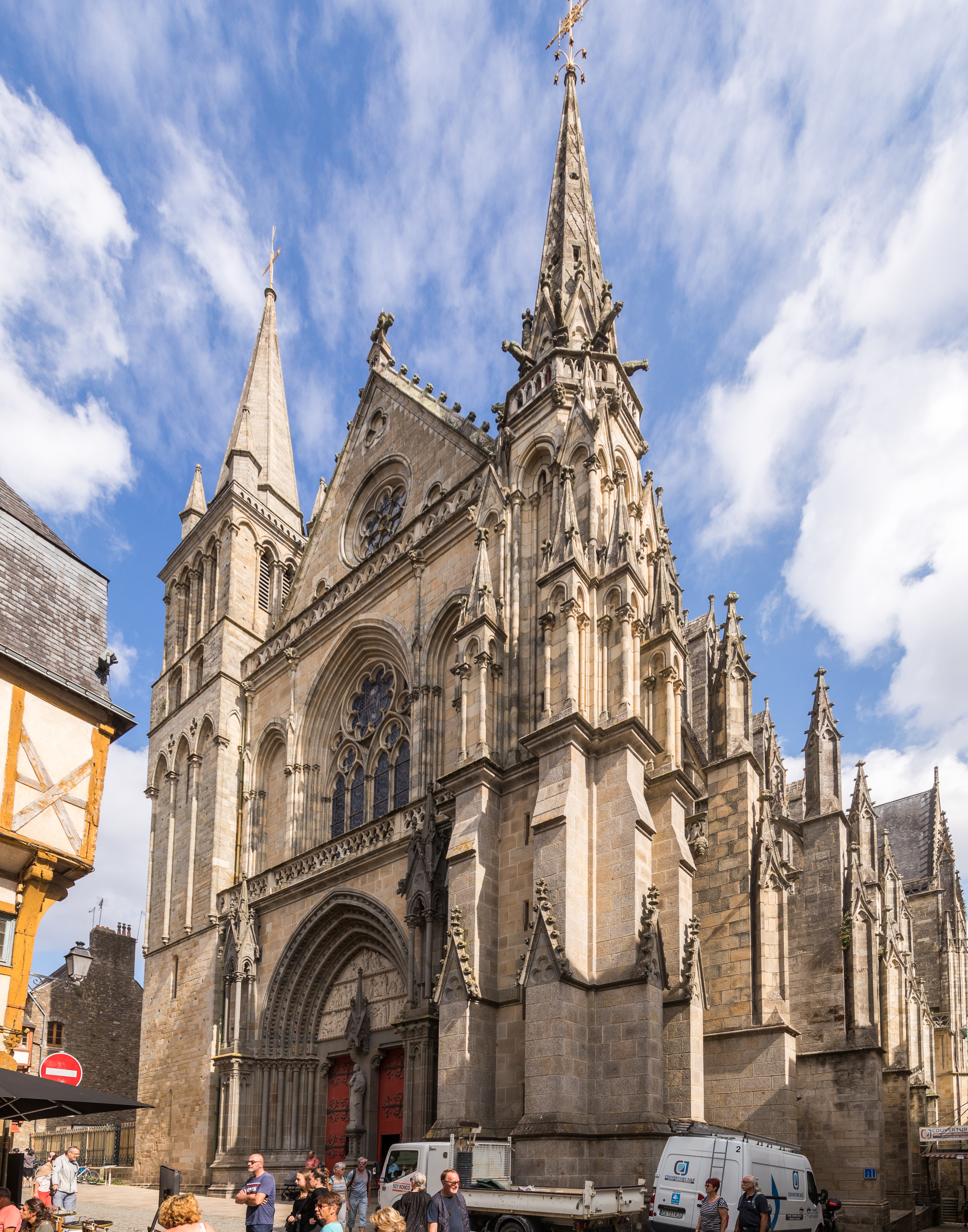
Vannes Cathedral

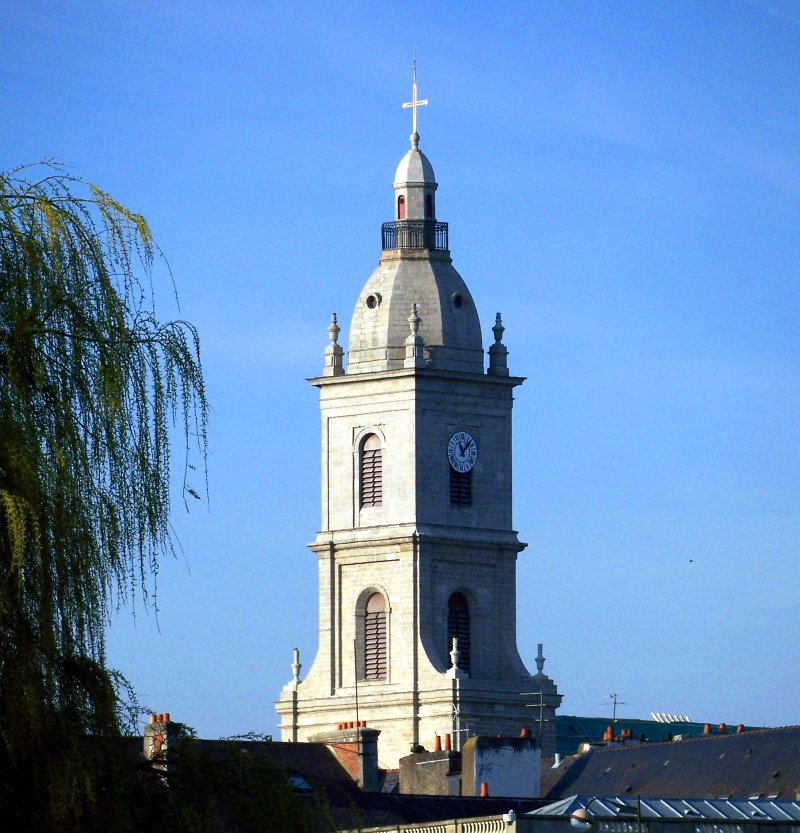
St. Patern church

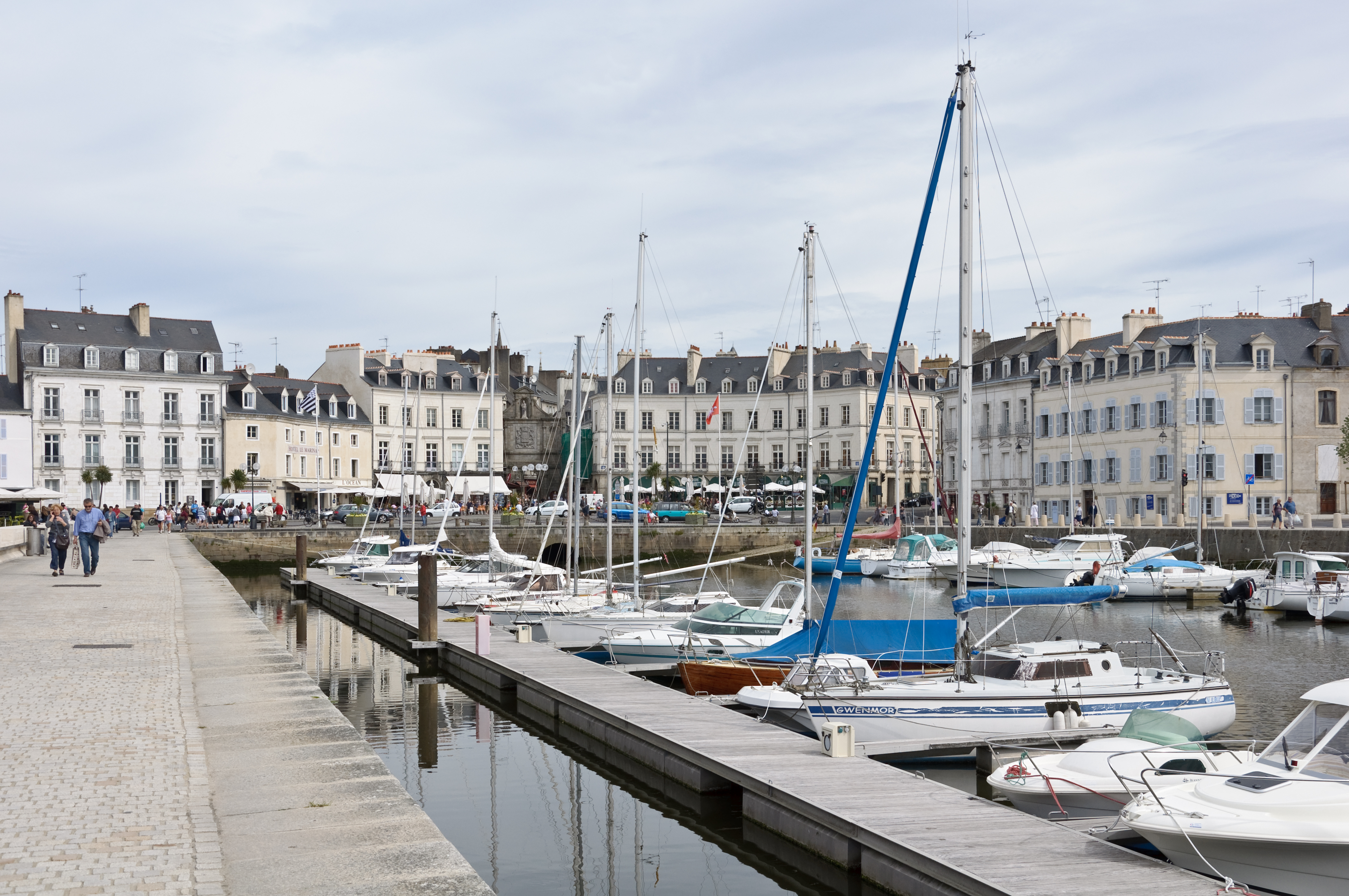
The port, at the foot of St. Vincent gate
