= Hôtel de Ville, Vannes =

Town hall in Vannes, France

Hôtel de Ville
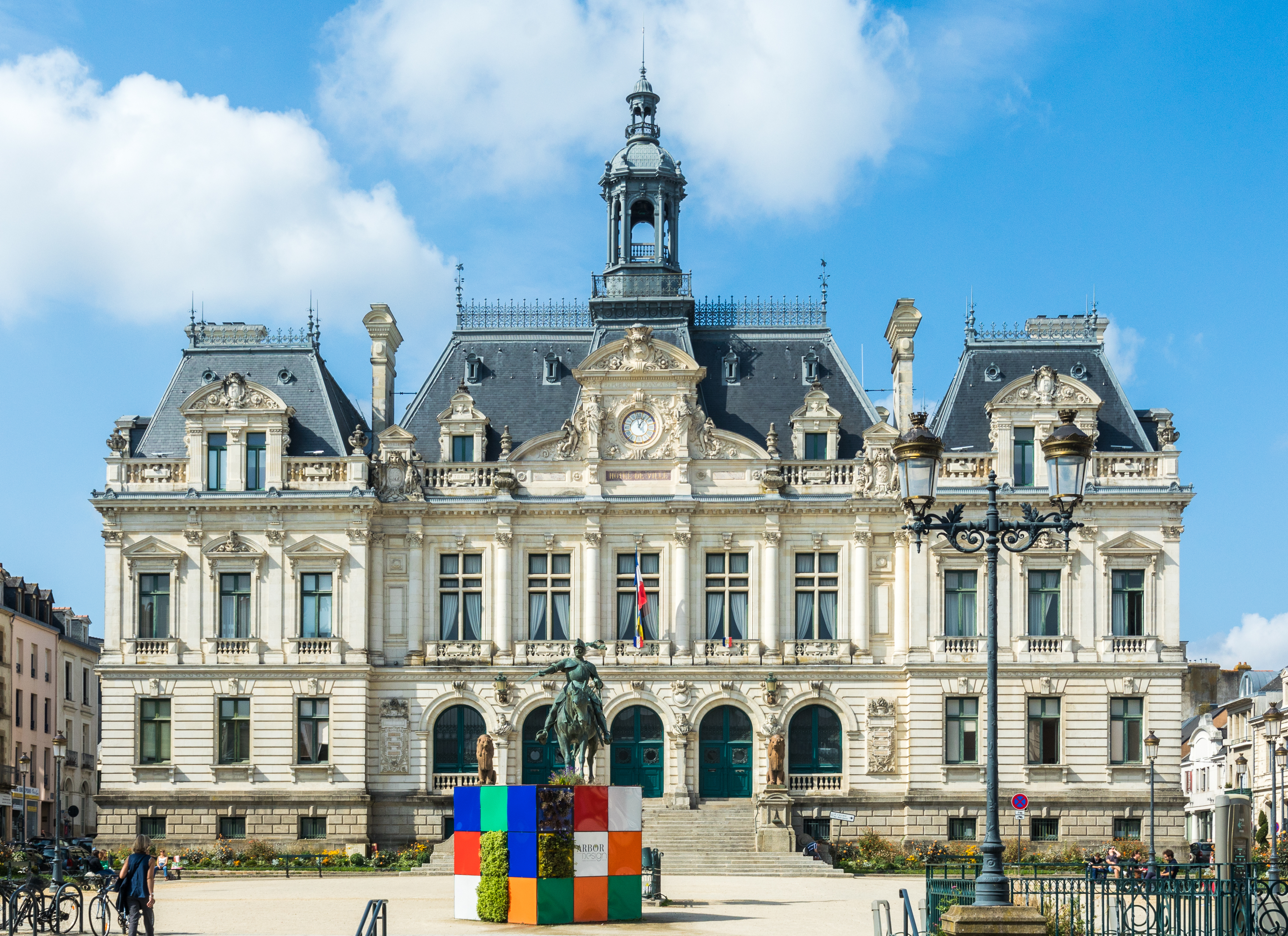
- The main frontage of the Hôtel de Ville in September 2022

General information
- Type: City hall
- Architectural style: Renaissance Revival style
- Location: Vannes, France
- Coordinates: 47.6584°N 2.7609°W
- Completed: 1886

Height
- Height: 37 metres (121 ft)

Design and construction
- Architect: Amand Charrier

Monument historique
- Official name: Hôtel de ville
- Type: Inscrit
- Designated: 1992
- Reference no.: PA00091814

The Hôtel de Ville (French pronunciation: [otɛl də vil], City Hall) is a municipal building in Vannes, Morbihan, western France, standing on Place Maurice-Marchais. It was designated a monument historique by the French government in 1992.

== History ==
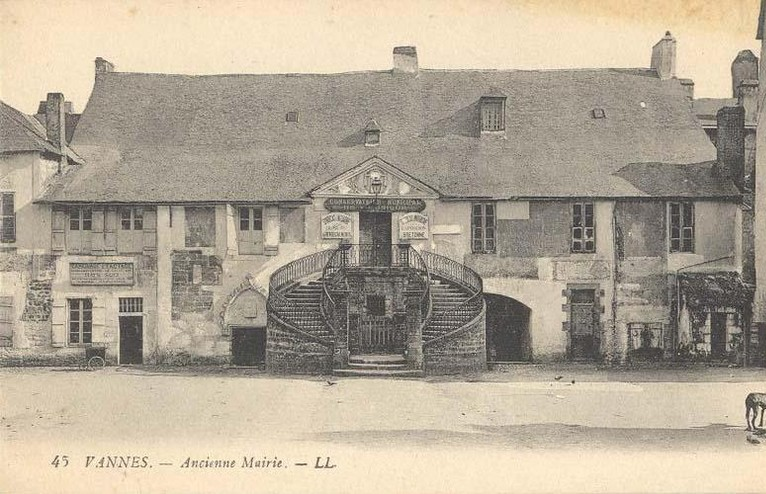
The old town hall

The first town hall in Vannes was an ancient building, previously used as a chambre des comptes (chamber of accounts), on the Place des Lices (now place Lucien Laroche) dating back to the 15th century. In 1560, Francis II, agreed to give the building to the aldermen of the town. Designed in a typical Breton style, it was a modest two storey building with a grand external staircase, in the form of a pair of curving semi-circles, leading up to the first-floor doorway, with a pediment above. (Note: The external staircase was recovered when the old town hall was demolished and installed in the courtyard of the Hôtel de Limur.) There was also a tall tower which was so unstable that it had to be demolished in 1860.

By the mid-19th century, the main block of the old town hall was dilapidated and the town council, led by the mayor, Émile Burgault, decided to commission a new building. The site they selected was the Place Napoléon (now Place Maurice-Marchais). The foundation stone for the new building was laid on 12 December 1880. It was designed by Amand Charrier in the Renaissance Revival style, built in ashlar stone at a cost of FFr 793,628 and was officially opened by the minister of post and telegraphs, Félix Granet, on 11 July 1886.

The design involved a symmetrical main frontage of 11 bays facing onto the Place du Marché with the last three bays on both sides projected forward as pavilions. The central section of five bays featured a short set of steps lead up to a loggia formed by five round headed openings with moulded surrounds and keystones. The first floor of the central section was fenestrated with tall square headed mullioned and transomed windows. The first-floor windows were flanked by Corinthian order columns supporting an entablature, a modillioned cornice and a clock. The clock was made by Gourdin of Mayet and was flanked by caryatids and surmounted by a segmental pediment. The outer sections of three bays each were fenestrated in a similar style except that the first-floor windows were surmounted by alternating triangular and segmental pediments and flanked by Corinthian order pilasters rather than columns. A 37 metres (121 ft) high belfry was installed behind the clock. Internally, the principal rooms were the Grand Staircase, the Salle du Conseil (council chamber), the Salle des Mariages (wedding room), the Salle des Fêtes (ballroom), and the Sale des Pas Perdus (Room of Lost Steps).

Two bronze lions, sculpted by Louis Villeminot, were installed flanking the steps. Statues of famous men, sculpted by Auguste Le Merle, were installed on the façade of the building. They depicted the statesman, the Comte de Mirabeau, the philosopher, René Descartes, the playwright, Alain-René Lesage, and the former president of France, Adolphe Thiers. A statue depicting Lucretia, sculpted by Louis-Adolphe Eude in 1869, and a bas-relief depicting Mary and Jesus, sculpted by Daniel Dupuis in 1879, were installed in the Sale des Pas Perdus (Room of Lost Steps).

A statue by Arthur Jacques Le Duc depicting Arthur III, Duke of Brittany was unveiled in front of the town hall in 1905. The town council announced, in May 2024, that a rectangular pool with a series of water jets would be installed around the statue to a design by Atelier Nàga in spring 2025.
