= John Oliver La Gorce =

American writer and explorer

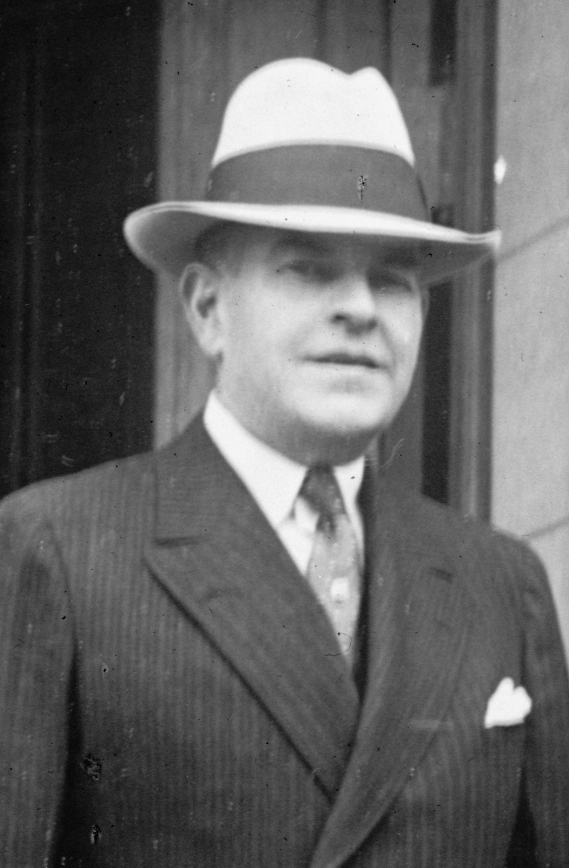
La Gorce in 1930

John Oliver La Gorce (September 22, 1880 – December 23, 1959) was an American writer and explorer known for his work in the National Geographic Society. He served as associate editor of the society from 1905 to 1922, vice president from 1922 to 1954, and president from 1954 to 1957, before retiring at the age of 77.

== Early life ==
John Oliver La Gorce was born on September 22, 1880 (some sources say 1879) in Scranton, Pennsylvania. As a youngster, he became very interested in the Morse code which his mother had taught him, and he went to the US Capitol to practice telegraphy.

However, his biggest interest was in exploring and geography, and he was hired in 1905 by Gilbert Hovey Grosvenor, the third president of the Society and who would become his close friend. He soon became popular in the Society, and in 1914 a special photo of him in his office was published in the Magazine.

== Career ==
La Gorce remained in the Society for 54 years, from 1905 until his death in 1959. He was an avid photographer and went to locations all around the world, taking many amazing pictures including sailboats in Lisbon harbor, tuna and seabirds feeding on sardines, El Capitan in Yosemite National Park, and many more. He also wrote many articles for the Magazine. His biggest interest was perhaps in fishes, and in 1919 he participated in a hunt that brought in a 22-foot manta ray, the world's biggest to date. He also helped produce the world's first underwater photographs in 1926, and edited all versions of the National Geographic's The Book of Fishes.

La Gorce was married to actress Betty Brice (they divorced in 1913), and had one child who he named after his friend, Gilbert Grosvenor La Gorce. His son died early in 1959, leaving La Gorce devastated. Nevertheless, he continued to work in the Society right up until his death in 1959. For less than three years, from May 1954 to January 1957, he had served as President of the Society, retiring mostly due to health problems. However, he was criticized for choosing not to change anything about the magazine (his successor, Melville Bell Grosvenor, son of Gilbert, changed the name of the Magazine to National Geographic in March 1960, which La Gorce chose never to do).

La Gorce was so influential in his work for the Magazine and world travels that many landmarks are named after him. These include the La Gorce Mountains in Antarctica and the La Gorce Arch in Utah. Additionally, La Gorce Island, the La Gorce neighborhood and the La Gorce Country Club in Miami Beach, Florida were named in his honor by his close friend Carl G. Fisher.

In addition to National Geographic, he served as a US Delegate in the 1925 Pan American Scientific Congress. He was given the Henry Grier Bryant Medal in 1948 by the Geographic Society of Philadelphia for "outstanding service to geography." Finally, in 1955, he was chosen by Columbia University as a leading journalist to receive the Maria Moors Cabot Award for promoting understanding among nations of the Americas.

John Oliver La Gorce died of unknown causes on December 23, 1959, at the age of 79. At the National Geographic Society, they hung the blue, brown and green flag at half mast.
