= Pierre de La Gorce =

French magistrate, lawyer and historian

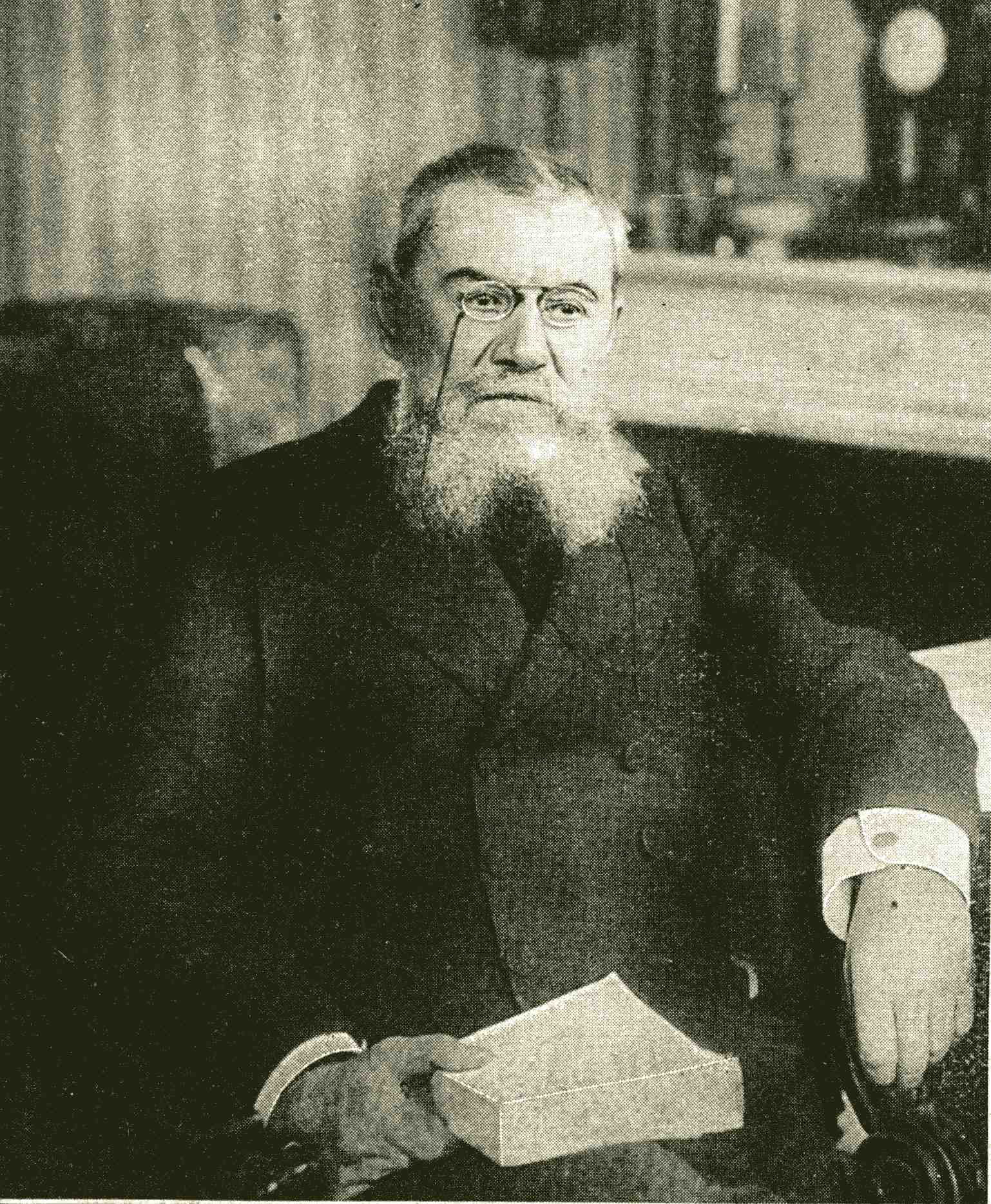
Pierre de La Gorce.

Pierre de La Gorce (19 June 1846, Vannes – 2 January 1934) was a French magistrate, lawyer and historian, as well as a member of the Académie française. He wrote books about the Second French Republic, the Second French Empire and the French Revolution, as well as other topics. He taught law of the Sorbonne.
