= La Gorce Island =

Island within the city of Miami Beach in Florida

Coordinates: 25.84812°N 80.129106°W

La Gorce Island is an island built in 1924 within the city of Miami Beach in Miami-Dade County, Florida, United States. It is located in Biscayne Bay in the La Gorce neighborhood, in the area of the city referred to as North Beach. The island and surrounding La Gorce neighborhood were named after Miami Beach developer Carl Fisher's close friend, John Oliver La Gorce, a renowned explorer, author, and president of the National Geographic Society. La Gorce Island, Inc. established the island in 1934 and maintained it until 1946, when the La Gorce Homeowners Association took over community governance.

La Gorce Island is estimated to be a 20-minute drive to the Miami International Airport, Downtown Miami, the Design District and Coconut Grove.

The properties located in La Gorce Island are said to showcase classic architectural details and design elements found in anything from newly constructed modern buildings to restored historic estates and mansions in the Mediterranean style, making for a diverse selection of accommodations. Many of the homes feature private docks.

Top-ranked public and private schools like North Beach Elementary, Nautilus Middle School, Miami Beach Senior High School, Lehrman Community Day School, The Montessori Academy at St. John's, The Cushman School, Miami Country Day School, Ransom Everglades School, Coconut Grove Montessori School, and St. Hugh Catholic School are located within a convenient distance for residents of La Gorce Island, making it an ideal location for families seeking high-quality education options for their children while enjoying the luxurious lifestyle the island offers.
