= Yr Afallennau =

Medieval Welsh poem

Yr Afallennau ("The Apple Trees"), also known as The Apple Tree Stanzas, is a Middle Welsh poem written in the first person about an unnamed figure generally understood for at least the last 700 years to have been Myrddin Wyllt, a legendary warrior and prophet said to have lived in North Britain in the 6th century. It combines Myrddin's lamentations over his life as a persecuted outlaw living in the wilderness with prophecies of the future of the Welsh nation. It survives in widely differing forms in several medieval Welsh manuscripts, the oldest of which is the Black Book of Carmarthen (c. 1250–1275).

== Summary ==
Based on John K. Bollard's translation of the Black Book of Carmarthen version (see below).

Beginning each stanza with an address to a "Sweet apple tree", the poet prophesies wars between Welsh and English and between the men of Pictland and invaders from Dublin. He speaks of himself as living alone in Celyddon Wood, having done battle "in order to please a maiden". He is surrounded by Rhydderch's lords. Gwenddydd hates him, for "I have destroyed her son and her daughter", and so does Gwasawg, Rhydderch's supporter. Why does death not take him? In the battle of Arfderydd he had a gold torque, but now he has no friend or lover. Why could death not have come before he had killed Gwenddydd's son? In former days, when he was calmer in mind, a fair and queenly maiden was with him, but for fifty years he has lived in sickness and sadness as an outlaw in the wilderness. May he become a servant of God! He again prophesies battles which will uproot the Saxons and bring prosperity to the poets. Cadwaladr and Cynan will come and the Saxons will be subdued. The Welsh will prevail and all will be set to rights.

== Context ==
The poem is set in the period after battle of Arfderydd, a conflict which was the subject of a body of early Welsh narrative now surviving only in fragmentary form. Piecing together evidence from different sources, the battle appears to have been fought between rival British forces in the year 573 in the neighbourhood of Arthuret, a village north of Carlisle in Cumbria. It is not certain who took part, but Myrddin's overlord Gwenddolau may have led one side and been killed during the course of the battle, and the leaders of the opposing side may have been Gwenddolau's first cousins Gwrgi and Peredur, sons of Eliffer. If so, the battle was an internecine struggle between the descendants of the legendary Coel Hen. Rhydderch Hael, or Rhydderch the Generous, was a northern king whom several poems represent as the man Myrddin most feared. Of his supporter Gwasawg nothing is known. Gwenddydd's relationship with Myrddin is not clear in this poem, but in another of the Myrddin poems, Cyfoesi Myrddin a Gwenddydd ei Chwaer, she is represented as being his sister. Cadwaladr, a 7th-century king of Gwynedd, and Cynan Meiriadog, the legendary founder of the kingdom of Brittany, were from as early as the 10th century coupled together in Welsh vaticinatory verse as future saviours of the Welsh nation.

== Manuscripts ==
The oldest manuscript in which Yr Afallennau survives is the Black Book of Carmarthen, dating from about the third quarter of the 13th century. The version of the poem given there comprises 10 stanzas. The National Library of Wales's MS Peniarth 3 (c. 1300) has a 16-stanza version. Their Hendregadredd Manuscript, dated between 1282 and the mid-14th century, has 6 stanzas, and MS Peniarth 50 (c. 1400–1450) gives an 18-stanza version. In total, the later manuscripts provide 10 stanzas not found in the Black Book of Carmarthen, possibly later in date than the Black Book stanzas. Still more were included in two 19th-century editions, The Myvyrian Archaiology of Wales (2nd, edition, 1870) and Thomas Stephens, The Literature of the Kymry (1849).

== Date ==
Opinions as to the date of Yr Afallennau vary widely, many seeing the poem as having grown by stages, the stanzas which describe Myrddin's life in the wilderness being earlier than those which prophesy future events. Gwyn Williams and Nikolai Tolstoy both suggested that the earlier stanzas were composed by a historical 6th-century Myrddin, but Tolstoy's arguments have been criticised as "highly conjectural", and there is now growing agreement that Myrddin was a purely legendary figure. A. O. H. Jarman tentatively dated the earlier stanzas between 850 and 1050, and Rachel Bromwich, followed by Peter Bartrum, assigned them a date before 1100. On the other hand, the prophetic stanzas include a clear reference to the Battle of Machafwy Vale (1198) and perhaps another to the Gwynedd prince Llewelyn ab Iorwerth (1173–1240), and must therefore have been written in 1198 at the earliest. John K. Bollard has argued that all the stanzas have a late date and that, while drawing on the poet's knowledge of earlier legendary material, the poem was most likely composed in its entirety in the 13th century.

== Reference translation ==
- John K. Bollard, in Goodrich, Peter, ed. (1990). The Romance of Merlin: An Anthology. Garland Reference Library of the Humanities, 867. New York: Garland. pp. 22–24. ISBN 9780824070427.
