= Thirteen Treasures of the Island of Britain =

Welsh mythical objects

The Thirteen Treasures of the Island of Britain (Welsh: Tri Thlws ar Ddeg Ynys Prydain) are a series of items in late-medieval Welsh tradition. Lists of the items appear in texts dating to the 15th and 16th centuries. The number of treasures is always given as thirteen, but some later versions list different items, replacing or combining entries to maintain the number.

== Manuscripts ==
Manuscripts

Group i
- A Peniarth 51, c. 1460; B NLW 17B, 18 cent. (Note: By David Ellis (d. 1795)); C NLW 562B, <1793?; Γ BL Add. 15020, 1768–69

Group ii
- D Peniarth 77, 1576

Group iii
- E BL Add. 15047, 1575–76

Group iv
- F Peniarth 179, c. 1587; G Cardiff 43, c. 1749; Ga BL Add. 15059, 1575–76 18th cent.; H Cardiff 2615, 1748

Group v
- Θ BL Add. 14919 , c. 1500; I Peniarth 216, 1607–1611 (Note: By John Hones of Gelli Lyfdy)

Group vi
- J Peniarth 60, c. 1500

Group vii
- K Peniarth 138, c. 1562; Ka NLW 5269B, for John Davies (d. 1644); L Cardiff 17 c. 1600 (Note: By John Jones of Gelli Lyfdy (d. c. 1658?)); M Cardiff 26, c. 1714; N Llanstephan 94, by Moses Williams (d. 1742); O Llanstephan 145, by Moses Williams (d. 1742); P Llanstephan 65, by Moses Williams (d. 1742)

Group viii
- Q Peniarth 295,

Group ix
- R Mostyn 159, 1586–87 (Note: By David ap Jenkin aMhredydd o Vachynnlleth for Huw Lewis of Hafodwen); S Cardiff 19, c. 1624; Sa Peniarth 195, 17th cent.; Sb Cardiff 66, 1690; T NLW 643C, 17th cent.?; U NLW 2602B, 19th cent.

Group x
- Group x: Y Cwrtmawr 200, by Lewis Morris, 1724; V Panton 13, Copied from Y by Evan Evans, (d. 1788); Va NLW 562B, 1793. Copied from V by Humphrey Thomas; W BL Add. 14873, by William Morris 1739–1760; X BL Add. 14873, by William Morris 1756–1760

Other sigla
- Addl. 1 = Add. 14919, fo. 128b (Θ); Addl. 2 = Add. 15020, fos. 34a-35a (Γ); Addl. 3 = Add. 15047, fos. 98a-101a (E)

Eurys I. Rowlands (1959) published a critical edition of text using 11 texts and 18 variants. Peter C. Bartrum in 1959 who had been working concurrently published an edition using 7 base texts and 13 variants, which catered for the needs of an English readership, but compiled an omnibus version collating 32 manuscripts divided into ten groups, plus 4 published texts.

Manuscript A in the hand of Gwilym Tew dates to c. 1460 but is a plain list of the treasures without the explanatory comments as given in later manuscripts. Other mss. date from the 16th to the 19th century. MS. L or Cardiff MS. 17, (Note: In the hand of Rowland Lewis of Mallwyd.) dating to c. 1600 was the base text used by Rachel Bromwich in her edition, which belonged to Group vii, listing 12 items (according to Bartrum) (Note: Cf. Table on p. 440 and the itemization of Ka in Group vii on Bartrum ed. (1963), pp. 449–450) or 13 items (for Bromwich who counts the crock & dish as double). (Note: Bromwich, text & translation of Tri Thlws ar Ddeg Ynys Bridain ("The Thirteen Treasures of the Island of Britain") from Cardiff 17, pp. 95–96.) Bromwich also appends surplus 14th and 15th items from other mss.

== Printed texts ==
- Edward Jones, Bardic Museum. London, 1808. pp. 47–49. Composite.
- Charlotte Guest, Mabinogion. London, 1849. II, pp. 353–354; "from an old MS. the collection of Mr Justice Bosanquet"; very close to Ks
- Y Brython 2 (1859), p. 41, nearly identical to Guest's
- Y Brython 3 (1860), p. 372, close to W

== List ==
The various treasures (tlws) include vessels or utensils for food and drink (hamper, cauldron, crock and dish, horn and knife), objects relating to weaponry (sword, whetstone) and to transport (halter, chariot), clothing (coat, mantle) and still other items (stone and ring, chessboard). Most of the items are placed in the Hen Ogledd or "Old North", the Brittonic-speaking parts of what is now southern Scotland and Northern England; some early manuscripts refer to the whole list specifically as treasures "that were in the North".

The number of treasures is always given as thirteen, but some later versions list different items, replacing or combining entries to maintain the number. Later versions also supplement the plainlist with explanatory comments about each treasure. The version edited by Bromwich (1961) lists the following thirteen treasures, based on Cardiff 17 (late 16th century):

1. Dyrnwin ("White-Hilt"), the Sword of Rhydderch Hael ("the Generous") (Middle Welsh: Dyrnwyn, gleddyf Rhydderch Hael): "if a well-born man drew it himself, it burst into flame from its hilt to its tip. And everyone who used to ask for it would receive; but because of this peculiarity everyone used to reject it. And therefore he was called Rhydderch the Generous".
2. The Hamper of Gwyddno Garanhir ("Long-Shank") (Mwys Gwyddno Garanir): "food for one man would be put in it, and when it was opened, food for a hundred men would be found in it".
3. The Horn of Brân Galed ("the Niggard") from the North (Corn Brân Galed o'r Gogledd): "whatever drink might be wished for was found in it".
4. The Chariot of Morgan Mwynfawr ("the Wealthy") (Car Morgan Mwynfawr): "if a man went in it, he might wish to be wherever he would, and he would be there quickly".
5. The Halter of Clydno Eiddyn (Cebystr Clydno Eiddin): which was fixed to a staple at the foot of his bed: whatever horse he might wish for, he would find in the halter.
6. The Knife of Llawfrodedd Farchog ("the Horseman") (Cyllell Llawfrodedd Farchog): "which would serve for twenty-four men to eat at table".
7. The Cauldron of Dyrnwch the Giant (Pair Dyrnwch Gawr): "if meat for a coward were put in it to boil, it would never boil; but if meat for a brave man were put in it, it would boil quickly (and thus the brave could be distinguished from the cowardly)".
8. The Whetstone of Tudwal Tudglyd (Hogalen Tudwal Tudclyd): "if a brave man sharpened his sword on the whetstone, then the sword would certainly kill any man from whom it drew blood. If a cowardly man used the whetstone, though, his sword would refuse to draw blood at all".
9. The Coat of Padarn Beisrudd ("Red-Coat") (Pais Badarn Beisrydd): "if a well-born man put it on, it would be the right size for him; if a churl, it would not go upon him".
10. and 11. The Crock and the Dish of Rhygenydd the Cleric (Gren a desgyl Rhygenydd Ysgolhaig): "whatever food might be wished for in them, it would be found".
12. The Chessboard of Gwenddoleu ap Ceidio (Gwyddbwyll Gwenddoleu ap Ceidio): "if the pieces were set, they would play by themselves. The board was of gold, and the men of silver".
13. The Mantle of Arthur in Cornwall (Llen Arthyr yng Nghernyw): "whoever was under it could not be seen, and he could see everyone".
14. The Mantle of Tegau Gold-Breast (Tegau Eurfron, wife of Caradoc/ Caradog Freichfras) (Mantell Degau Eurvron): "Her mantle would not serve for any woman who had violated her marriage or her virginity". It would reach to the ground when worn by a faithful woman but would only hang down to the lap of an unfaithful wife.
15. The Stone Ring of Eluned the Fortunate (Maen a Modrwy Eluned ddedwyd)

The surpluses, numbers 14 and 15 (Tegaus's and Eluned's items) are parenthesized by Bromwich, and are actually lacking in her base manuscript (Cardiff 17, or L, in Group xvii); (Note: As aforementioned, Cardiff 17 in group vii has only 12 items as tabulated in Bartrum's "Order of the Items" (whereas Bromwich increases the count to 13 by numbering "Crock and Dish" as #10 and #11). In the same group vii mss. O and P list an extra item, the "coulter" (explained below), bringing their count to 13.) but 14 and 15 do occur in the oldest ms. (A), except not in the original hand, but by "later addition". (Note: See transcript of the name-only text from MS. A (Peniarth 51) on Bartrum ed. (1963), p. 441, where the text "[12] Mantell Degav, [13] Maen modrwy Eluned" delimited by two *s indicate a "later addition". Also note that on the "Order of the Items" table on p. 440, footnote b states "(A) and Γ" only, where A enclosure in parentheses apparently indicates later interpolation.) Number 14 (Tegau's mantle) actually occurs in a majority of manuscripts, (Note: Lacking in 2 of Group i, all 4 of iv, all 7 of vii, and 1 of v) while number 15 (Eluned's ring) are only present in 7 mss. (Note: 2 in Group i, the 1 single ms. D in ii, 4 in x)

Where the surplus items are added other treasures are dropped and the Crock and the Dish of Rhygenydd the Cleric are counted as one item, as Bromwich explains it. (Note: As is the case with ms. A in Group i: from the "Order of the Items", it is clear A omits Bartrum's No. 7. (halter) And Bartrum's table's No. 12. (Gren a Dysgl Rhygannedd) counts Dish and Crock as one.)

The surplus items come from literary sources (Arthurian romance) rather than traditional material, e.g., the ring's original owner Eluned is the Welsh counterpart of Lunete from Yvain, the Knight of the Lion. (cf. § Mantle of Tegau Gold-Breast and § Ring of Eluned, respectively).

There is yet another surplus item, the Coulter of Tringer son of Nuddnot (Cwlldr Tringer fab Nuddnot): "Where it was borrowed for use in a plough, it would plough until it was asked to stop". The item is also given as the Coulter of Rhun the Giant (Rhun Gawr) depending on the manuscript.

== Description ==
Some of the magical objects listed can be shown to have earlier origins in Welsh narrative tradition. Items 2 (hamper), 7 (cauldron) and 13 (Mantle of Arthur), for instance, are also described in the Middle Welsh tale Culhwch ac Olwen (tentatively dated to c. 1100), in which Ysbaddaden the Giant gives King Arthur's cousin Culhwch a list of impossible tasks (anoetheu) which he has to complete in order to win the hand of Olwen, the giant's daughter.

=== Myrddin Wyllt ===
Later lore claims that Myrddin Wyllt (≈Merlin of the Arthurian romances) took possession of the Thirteen Treasures and evacuated them to his House of Glass. (Note: Peniarth MS. 147 (c. 1566), p. 14 and MSS. Y (and VW), where it is stated the treasures were taken from Caerleon and that the House of Glass where they wound up was on Ynys Enlli (Bardsey Island))

=== Dyrnwyn ===
The Dyrnwyn ("White-Hilt"), the Sword of Rhydderch Hael the Generous, one of the Three Generous Men of Britain mentioned in the Welsh Triads. When drawn by a worthy or well-born man, the entire blade would blaze with fire. Rhydderch was never reluctant to hand the weapon to anyone, hence his nickname Hael meaning "the Generous", but the recipients, as soon as they had learned of its peculiar properties, always rejected the sword. Rhyedderch was one who Myrddin Wyllt feared most in the aftermath of the Battle of Arfderydd according to allusions in the poems contained in the Black Book of Carmarthen. He is the equivalent of Rodricus rex Cumborum (with the epithet largus) who appears in Geoffrey of Monmouth's Vita Merlini.

=== Hamper of Gwyddno Garanhir ===
It is told that Gwyddno Garanhir ("Long-shank") possessed a hamper (mwys) which would multiply food: if one was to put food for one man in the basket and open it again, the food was found to be increased a hundredfold. This is identified by Bromwich as the oldest item among the Thirteen to be attested, being one of the anoethau of Culhwch ac Olwen.

=== Horn of Brân Galed ===
The Horn of Brân Galed ("the Stingy" or "the Niggard") from the North is said to have possessed the magical property of ensuring that "whatever drink might be wished for was found in it". Marginal notes to the text in Peniarth MS 147 (c. 1566) elaborate on this brief entry by saying that Myrddin had approached the kings and lords of Britain to request their treasures. They consented on the condition that he obtained the horn of Brân Galed, supposing that the task would be impossible to fulfill (whether owing to Brân's reputation for being close-fisted or for some other reason). However, Myrddin somehow succeeded in obtaining the drinking horn and so received the other treasures as well. He took his hoard to the "Glass House" (Tŷ Gwydr), where it would remain forever. Tracing the prehistory of the horn to the Greek mythological past, the same notes tell that Hercules had removed the horn from the head of the centaur he had slain, whose wife then killed the hero in bloody revenge.

The discrepancy between Brân's nickname ("the Stingy") and the special property of the enchanted horn appears to be explained by the Welsh poet Guto'r Glyn, who lived in the mid-15th century and was therefore contemporary with the earliest attestations of the Tri Thlws ar Ddeg. He relates that Brân Galed was a northern nobleman, whom Taliesin transformed into a man superior to the Tri Hael, i.e. the three most generous men in Britain according to one of the Welsh Triads. Later bards to allude to the treasure include Tudur Aled and Iorwerth Fynglwyd.

The identity of Brân Galed (not to be confused with Brân the Blessed) is uncertain. His northern background, which is usually described in general terms, is specified in one place elsewhere. A 16th-century note written by the scribe Gruffudd Hiraethog (died 1564) identifies Brân as the son of one Emellyr, which appears to refer to the Brân son of Ymellyrn who is depicted in the Llywarch Hen cycle of poems as an opponent of the kings of Rheged. The latter has also been equated with the Brân fighting at Cynwyd (northern Wales) in the poem Gwarchan Tudfwlch, possibly against Owain of Rheged.

=== Chariot of Morgan Mwynfawr ===
The chariot belonging to Morgan Mwynfawr ("the Wealthy") is described as a magical vehicle which would quickly reach whatever destination one might wish to go to.

=== Halter of Clydno Eiddyn ===
Belonged to Clydno Eiddyn (Cebystr Clydno Eiddin). It was fixed to a staple at the foot of his bed. Whatever horse he might wish for, he would find in the halter. The Halter of Clydno Eiddyn was also called The Handy Halter, for it summons fine horses.

=== Knife of Llawfrodedd the Horseman ===
Llawfrodedd Farchog (from marchog "the Horseman"), or Barfawc "the Bearded" in other manuscripts, is said to have owned a knife which would serve for a company of 24 men at the dinner table.

=== Cauldron of Dyrnwch the Giant ===
The cauldron (pair) of Dyrnwch the Giant is said to discriminate between cowards and brave men: whereas it would not boil meat for a coward, it would boil quickly if that meat belonged to a brave man.

The earlier poem Preiddeu Annwfn (The Spoils of Annwfn), refers to an adventure by Arthur and his men to obtain a cauldron with similar attribute (it does not boil meat for cowards, according to the Book of Taliesin. (Note: "peir pen annwfyn.. . ny beirw bwytllwfyr (The cauldron of the Head of Annwfn does not boil the meat of cowards)", BT, ed. J. G. Evans (1910), p. 55, 2–3. apud Bromwich (1978), p. 246, note to 7. Pair Dyrnwch Gawr. Bromwich credits Loomis, R. S. (1956) Wales and the Arthurian Legend, pp. 156–157 for noticing this parallel.))

However, the cauldron of Dyrnwch the Giant among the Thirteen Treasures appears to derive from the cauldron among the anoetheu in the Middle Welsh tale Culhwch ac Olwen, i.e., the cauldron of Diwrnach the Irishman, steward (maer) to Odgar son of Aedd, King of Ireland. King Arthur requests the cauldron from King Odgar, but Diwrnach refuses to give up his prized possession. Arthur goes to visit Diwrnach in Ireland, accompanied by a small party, and is received at his house, but when Diwrnach refuses to answer Arthur's request a second time, Bedwyr (Arthur's champion) seizes the cauldron and entrusts it to one of Arthur's servants, who is to carry the load on his back. In a single sweep with the sword called Caledfwlch, Llenlleawg the Irishman kills off Diwrnach and all his men. A confrontation with Irish forces ensues, but Arthur and his men fight them off. They board their ship Prydwen and, taking with them the cauldron loaded with the spoils of war, return to Britain.

In the poem Preiddeu Annwfn, the owner of the cauldron is the king of Annwn, the Welsh Otherworld, whereas in Culhwch tthw owner is an Irish king, suggesting a later attempt to euhemerize an older tale.

Diwrnach's name, which derives from Irish Diugurach and exhibits no literary provenance, may have been selected by the author of Culhwch ac Olwen to emphasize the Irish setting of his story. Although Dyrnwch is not himself described as an Irishman, it is probable that his name goes back to Diwrnach. The extant manuscripts of Tri Thlws ar Ddeg also present such variant spellings as Dyrnog and Tyrnog, without the Irish-sounding ending, but on balance, these are best explained as Welsh approximations of a foreign name.

=== Whetstone of Tudwal Tudglyd ===
Sharpens the blade of a fine warrior. It shall draw blood from any enemy of its user if its user be brave; if its user shall be cowardly, then the blade shall not be sharpened and draw no blood whatsoever.

=== Coat of Padarn Beisrudd ===
Padarn's coat perfectly fits any brave man; will not fit cowards.

=== Crock and Dish of Rhygenydd Ysgolhaig ===
Belonged to Rhygenydd the Cleric. Whatever food might be wished for in them, it would be found on them.

=== Chessboard of Gwenddoleu ap Ceidio ===
Rather large chess board with pieces of silver and crystal and the board made of gold. The pieces only play by themselves if all the pieces are set up correctly.

=== Mantle of Arthur ===
King Arthur's llen or mantle is said to make anyone underneath it invisible, though able to see out. This item is known from two other sources, the prose tales Culhwch and Olwen (c. 1100) and The Dream of Rhonabwy (early 13th century). A very similar mantle also appears in the Second Branch of the Mabinogi, in which it is used by Caswallawn to assassinate the seven stewards left behind by Brân the Blessed and usurp the throne.

In Culhwch Arthur's mantle is included in the list of the only things Arthur will not give to the protagonist Culhwch, but it is not named specifically or otherwise described. However, the names of several of the other items contain the element gwyn, meaning "white; sacred; blessed", suggesting otherworldly connections for the whole list. In The Dream of Rhonabwy, the mantle is specifically named Gwenn, and has properties analogous to those given in the lists of the Thirteen Treasures, though here it is those on top of the mantle who are made invisible.

=== Mantle of Tegau Gold-Breast ===
Tegau Gold-Breast (Tegau Eurfron, wife of Caradoc) was a Welsh heroine. Her mantle would not serve for any woman who had violated her marriage or her virginity. It would reach to the ground when worn by a faithful woman but would only hang down to the lap of an unfaithful wife.

The Mantle comes from a version of the mantle of chastity story, of which there is a whole group of works in the Arthurian cycle; (Note: Bromwich, note 14. Mantell Degau. Bromwich defers to Roger Sherman Loomis; Kenneth G. T. Webster, tr. (1951) Lanzelet, pp. 211-212) one representative work Livre de Caradoc from the First Perceval Continuation features Caradoc as husband of Tegau-Guinier with the Gold Breast, (Note: In Welsh tradition there is the figure of Caradawc Vreichvras ("Strong-arm"), called Caradoc in French. In Livre de Caradoc, Caradoc's wife is considered to be Tegau of the mantle, or rather a woman named Guinier who is Tegau God-Breast's double, by virtue of having a gold-breast. The gold breast magically appeared after she sacrificed her nipple to the bite of a serpent to lure it away from winding around Caradoc's arm.) but the chastity test employs a drinking horn and not a mantle. (Note: In the Livre de Caradoc, Guinier triumphs in the chastity test over other ladies in Arthur's court, but this is accomplished by Caradoc successfully drinking from the horn to prove his wife's fidelity.) One Arthurian chastity tale that does involve a mantle is Le mantel mautaillié, (Note: Which Bromwich spells as Le Manteau Mal Taillé,).) (Note: Another Arthurian mantle test tale is the Old Norse Möttuls saga.)

=== Ring of Eluned ===
Eluned's stone and ring (Lunete's ring) come from the prose tale Owain, or the Lady of the Fountain. (Note: Bromwich, note "15. The allusion is to the episode in the romance of Iarlles y Ffynnawn.) The "Three Treasures" text itself explained that it was the ring that the girl Eluned gave to Owain son of Urien (Ywain ap Urien) when he was trapped between the portcullis and the gate.

One might describe it as a ring of invisibility, as it hides the wearer "if the stone were hidden", according to the Thirteen Treasures text) that is to say, when he clasps his hand over the stone he becomes invisible, as described in the Welsh tale of Owain of the Mabinogion as well as Chrétien de Troyes's French version Yvain.

== See also ==
- Four Treasures, The four hallows of Ireland
- The Chronicles of Prydain, which includes Dyrnwyn as part of its mythos.

== Bibliography ==
=== Primary sources ===
- Bartrum, Peter C. (1963). "Tri Thlws ar Ddeg Ynys Brydain (The Thirteen Treasures of the Island of Britain)". Études celtiques. 10 (2): 434–477. doi:10.3406/ecelt.1963.1372.
- Bromwich, Rachel (1978) [1961]. "Appendix III. Tri Thlws ar Ddeg Yn(y)s Brydain (a oedd yn y Gogledd)" [The Thirteen Treasures of the Island of Britain (which were in the North)]. Trioedd Ynys Prydein: The Welsh Triads (2 ed.). Cardiff: University of Wales Press. pp. 240–242 (text & translation), 242–249 (notes).
  - Bromwich (2014) [1961]. Trioedd Ynys Prydein: The Triads of the Island of Britain. pp. 258–265. ISBN 9781783161461.
  - Bromwich, first published in 1961, revised ed. 1991, (also electronic edition, 2014, ISBN 9781783161478)
- Culhwhc ac Olwen, ed. Rachel Bromwich and D. Simon Evans, Culhwch and Olwen: An Edition and Study of the Oldest Arthurian Tale. University of Wales Press, 1992; tr. Jones and Jones, The Mabinogion.
- Rowlands, Eurys I. "Y Tri Thlws ar Ddeg." Llên Cymru 5 (1958/9): 33–69, 145–7.

=== Secondary sources ===
- Carey, John. Ireland and the Grail. Aberystwyth: Celtic Studies Publications, 2007.
- Gantz, Jeffrey (translator) (1987). The Mabinogion. New York: Penguin. ISBN 0-14-044322-3.
- Green, Thomas (2007). Concepts of Arthur. Stroud, Gloucestershire: Tempus. ISBN 978-0-7524-4461-1.
- Jones, Mary. "Tri Thlws ar Ddeg Ynys Prydain". From maryjones.us. Retrieved June 16, 2009.
- Jones, Mary. "The Horn of Bran". From maryjones.us. Retrieved June 17, 2009.
- Sims-Williams, Patrick. "The Significance of the Irish Personal Names in Culhwch and Olwen." Bulletin of the Board of Celtic Studies 29 (1982): 607–10.
