= Vita Merlini =

Medieval literary work (c. 1150)

Vita Merlini, or The Life of Merlin, is a Latin poem in 1,529 hexameter lines written around the year 1150. Though doubts have in the past been raised about its authorship it is now widely believed to be by Geoffrey of Monmouth. It tells the story of Merlin's madness, his life as a wild man of the woods, and his prophecies and conversations with his sister, Ganieda, and the poet Taliesin. Its plot derives from previous Celtic legends of early Middle Welsh origin, traditions of the bard Myrddin Wyllt and the wild man Lailoken, and it includes an important early account of King Arthur's final journey to Avalon, but it also displays much pseudo-scientific learning drawn from earlier scholarly Latin authors. Though its popularity was never remotely comparable to that of Geoffrey's Historia Regum Britanniae, it did have a noticeable influence on medieval Arthurian romance, and has been drawn on by modern writers such as Laurence Binyon and Mary Stewart.

== Synopsis ==
The author briefly addresses the dedicatee of the poem, Robert de Chesney, Bishop of Lincoln, then begins his story. Merlin (Merlinus in the Latin of the poem) is introduced as being a prophet (vates) and king of Dyfed, who takes part in an unnamed battle alongside Peredur (Peredurus), king of Gwynedd, and Rhydderch (Rodarchus), king of the Cumbrians, against Gwenddoleu (Guennolous), king of Scotland. Gwenddoleu is defeated, but three brothers of Peredur (or possibly of Merlin – the poem is ambiguous on this point) are among the slain, and Merlin so grieves at their deaths that he goes mad and runs off into the Caledonian Forest, where he lives on grass and fruit. News of Merlin's whereabouts eventually reaches his sister Gwenddydd (Ganieda), wife of Rhydderch, and she sends an emissary into the woods to find her brother. He finds Merlin lamenting the harshness of the winter, and responds by singing about the grief of Gwenddydd and Merlin's wife Gwendolen (Guendoloena). The sweetness of this song soothes Merlin so effectively as to bring him back to lucidity, and he is persuaded to visit his sister at Rhydderch's court. Once he is there the strain of facing crowds brings on a relapse, and Merlin has to be chained to prevent him returning to the woods. When Merlin sees a leaf in Gwenddydd's hair he laughs, but refuses to explain his laughter unless he is freed. When this is done he tells Rhydderch that the leaf got into Gwenddydd's hair when she lay outdoors with her lover. Gwenddydd then seeks to discredit Merlin by a trick. She produces a boy on three different occasions, dressed in different costume every time to disguise his identity, and asks her brother each time how he will die. The first time Merlin says he will die in a fall from a rock, the second time that he will die in a tree, and the third time that he will die in a river. Rhydderch is thus persuaded that Merlin can be fooled, and that his judgement is not to be trusted. Merlin is asked if his wife can marry again, and he consents to this, but warns any future husband to beware of him. The author now explains that in later years the boy fell from a rock, was caught in the branches of a tree beneath it, and being entangled there upside down with his head in a river he drowned. Back in the woods Merlin reads in the stars that Gwendolen is remarrying, so he attends her wedding mounted on a stag. Wrenching the antlers off his stag he throws them at the groom and kills him, but failing to make good his escape he is captured and taken back to Rhydderch's court. There he sees first a beggar and then a young man buying leather to patch his shoes, and he laughs at each of them. Rhydderch again offers Merlin his freedom if he will explain why he laughed, and Merlin answers that the beggar was unknowingly standing over buried treasure and that the young man's fate was to drown before he could wear his repaired shoes. When Merlin's words are confirmed Rhydderch lets Merlin go.

Back in the woods Merlin watches the stars in an observatory Gwenddydd has made for him, and prophesies the future history of Britain as far as the Norman kings. Rhydderch dies and Gwenddydd grieves for him. Rhydderch's visitor Taliesin (Telgesinus) goes to the woods to see Merlin, and there he talks to him at length on a variety of learned subjects: cosmogony, cosmology, the natural history of fishes, and finally a survey of the world's islands, including the island of apples where Morgen tends King Arthur. Merlin prophesies a little more, then reminisces about the history of Britain from Constans's reign to Arthur's. A new spring of water miraculously appears, and when Merlin drinks from it his madness lifts and he gives thanks to God for his cure. Taliesin discourses on notable springs around the world. On hearing that Merlin has been cured a number of princes and chieftains visit him in the woods and try to persuade him to resume the governance of his kingdom, but Merlin pleads his advanced age and the delight he takes in nature as reasons for refusing. A flock of cranes appears in the sky, prompting Merlin to teach them about the habits of the crane, and then those of many other kinds of bird. A lunatic appears, and Merlin recognizes him as one of the friends of his youth, Maeldinus, who had been sent mad by eating poisoned apples that had been intended for Merlin himself. Maeldinus is cured by drinking from the new spring, and it is resolved that he, Taliesin, Merlin, and Gwenddydd will remain together in the woods, in retirement from the secular world. The poem ends with a prophecy from Gwenddydd detailing events in the reign of King Stephen, and a renunciation by Merlin of his own prophetic gift.

== Composition ==
Geoffrey of Monmouth (c. 1100 – c. 1155) was a churchman and writer of uncertain ancestry (Welsh, Breton and Norman have all been suggested) who from 1129 to 1152 lived in Oxford. During the 1130s he wrote his first two works, the Historia Regum Britanniae (History of the Kings of Britain) or De Gestis Britonum (Of the Deeds of the Britons), a largely fictional history of Britain from the time of the Trojans down to the 7th century, featuring significant appearances by Merlin and King Arthur, and the Prophetiae Merlini (Prophecies of Merlin). Both works were sensationally successful and had the effect of turning Merlin and Arthur into internationally known figures of legend. Both were written in prose, though the Historia included two short poems which John Milton was to praise for their smoothness, and which both Milton and Alexander Pope translated into English verse. The last work generally attributed to Geoffrey was a much longer poem, the Vita Merlini. The attribution rests partly on the last lines of the poem, which have been translated thus:

I have brought this song to an end. Therefore, ye Britons, give a wreath to Geoffrey of Monmouth. He is indeed yours for once he sang of your battles and those of your chiefs, and he wrote a book called The Deeds of the Britons which are celebrated throughout the world.

In the only complete manuscript of the poem these lines are followed by a note in a later hand identifying the author of the poem as Geoffrey of Monmouth. There is also the evidence of the Vita's dedication to a Robert, Bishop of Lincoln, usually identified as Robert de Chesney, in which the poet says that he had formerly dedicated another work to the previous bishop of Lincoln. Since Geoffrey did indeed dedicate his Prophetiae Merlini to Alexander, Bishop of Lincoln, Robert de Chesney's immediate predecessor, the case for Geoffrey's authorship of the Vita is strengthened. Some 19th and early 20th-century critics doubted or denied that Geoffrey was the author, alleging differences in style between that poem and the Historia, pointing out that some late 12th-century commentators on the Merlin legend do not mention the Vita, and interpreting the poem as alluding to events that happened after Geoffrey's death. However, Geoffrey's authorship is now widely accepted. Assuming that this view is correct the date of the poem can be estimated, since Robert de Chesney became bishop of Lincoln in December 1148, while Geoffrey died in 1155. Moreover, it has been urged that Geoffrey's election to the bishopric of St Asaph in 1151 would probably have freed him from the necessity of finding patrons like Robert de Chesney, and that one of the Vita's prophecies includes a likely reference to the battle of Coleshill in 1150. If both of these arguments are accepted then the poem was completed in late 1150 or early 1151.

== Sources and analogues ==
In the Historia Regum Britanniae Geoffrey presented Merlin as a south Welsh prophet who gives advice to the 5th-century kings Vortigern, Aurelius Ambrosius and Uther Pendragon, but the Merlin of the Vita seems to be a significantly different figure, still a prophet but also a warrior-king turned madman active in the 6th-century Hen Ogledd (Old North). Geoffrey explicitly identified the two Merlins by making the hero of the Vita a king of Dyfed in south Wales and by having him reminisce, as a preternaturally long-lived man, about his career in the previous century as recorded in the Historia, but the poem nevertheless gives the impression that two different legends have been with some difficulty yoked together, a south Welsh one and a north British one. The Celticist A. O. H. Jarman proposed in the 1950s that the south Welsh legend concerned a prophet called Myrddin, associated with the town of Carmarthen (in Welsh Caerfyrddin) and named after it, while the northern legend was about a wild man called Lailoken who took part in the battle of Arfderydd in 573. These two stories, argued Jarman, became fused into one composite legend long before the Vita Merlini was written, and Geoffrey simply used different parts of the story in the Historia and the Vita. This theory was accepted by most late-20th century scholars, but has been challenged by Rachel Bromwich and Oliver Padel, who have each proposed the possibility that Geoffrey himself was responsible for uniting the southern legend of Myrddin and the northern legend of the wild man.

Among the most important analogues of the Vita Merlini are a small number of Middle Welsh poems. Cyfoesi Myrddin a Gwenddydd ei Chwaer ("The Conversations of Myrddin and his Sister Gwenddydd") consists mainly of questions by Gwenddydd and prophecies in response by Myrddin, who is represented as a madman. Rhydderch and the battle of Arfderydd are mentioned. Yr Afallennau ("The Apple-trees") is a poem containing much prophecy and also a lament by the narrator over his own circumstances. He has spent fifty years wandering, a madman among madmen, in the Caledonian Forest, having survived the battle of Arfderydd. There are references to Gwenddolau, Rhydderch and Gwenddydd. In Yr Oianau ("The Greetings") the narrator lives in the wilds with a little pig, both suffering from the persecution of Rhydderch. At one point he mourns the death of Gwenddolau. Finally, Ymddiddan Myrddin a Thaliesin ("The Dialogue of Myrddin and Taliesin"), includes a prophetic description of the battle of Arfderydd, but does not otherwise contain much legendary material.

The figure of Lailoken appears in three Latin sources: a Life of St. Kentigern written by Jocelin of Furness at some point between 1175 and 1199 but containing material that may derive from a lost 11th century Life, and two short narratives, not easily dateable, called Lailoken A and Lailoken B. The Life of St. Kentigern includes an episode in which a homo fatuus (meaning either idiot or jester) called Laloecen at the court of Rhydderch correctly prophesies the king's death. In Lailoken B the hero detects the queen's adultery by a leaf caught on her shawl, but is discredited when he predicts his own death in three different manners, only to be vindicated when he is beaten, transfixed by a stake, and drowned in the river Tweed. Lailoken A has the threefold death story without the adultery, and also presents him as a wild man of the woods whose misfortunes are a punishment for his having caused a battle easily identifiable as the battle of Arfderydd; he is also explicitly identified with Merlin (Merlynum).

An Irish analogue to the Vita exists in the tale of Buile Shuibhne. In this work, written in the 12th century but based on earlier stories, the warrior Suibne goes mad during the battle of Moira and escapes into the wilderness. Though he is cured and re-enters society he relapses and returns to the wilds, and his wife remarries.

Some details of the Vita may be taken from other Celtic sources. One of Merlin's prophecies, it has been argued, includes a reminiscence of the 10th-century prophetic poem Armes Prydein. The description of the first finding and capture of Merlin shows close resemblances to an episode in the Vita Gurthierni, a life of St Gurthiern of Quimperlé. The name Morgen appears in the Vita Merlini as the eldest of nine sisters who tend King Arthur in Avalon. Though this is the first explicit appearance of Morgan le Fay in literature there have been many attempts to trace her origins in various earlier Celtic goddesses. The Vita names Barinthus as the helmsman of the ship that took Arthur to Avalon, and he has been identified as the Barrintus who told Saint Brendan of a wonderful island in the western ocean, but it is uncertain which version of the Brendan story Geoffrey came across.

Geoffrey was not entirely dependent on Celtic sources for his poem. As a humanist writer of the 12th-century Renaissance he had a knowledge of much classical and medieval Latin literature at his command, and this fact is evident in his Vita Merlini, even in his choice of meter, the classical hexameter. Merlin and Taliesin's conversations together on cosmology, natural history and geography largely derive from medieval Latin writers associated with the Chartres School and from Isidore of Seville's Etymologiae, a 7th-century encyclopedia which was hugely popular through the Middle Ages. The theme of Merlin's laughter at the beggar and at the man buying leather has analogues in Greek and Jewish literature that can be traced back to the Talmud. Other writers who have been suggested as minor sources of the Vita include Solinus, Rabanus Maurus, Bede, Pomponius Mela, Ovid, Virgil, Horace, Apuleius, Boethius, Bernardus Silvestris, Adelard of Bath, Lambert of Saint-Omer, and the author of the De imagine mundi.

== Criticism ==
The Vita Merlini is written according to medieval ideas as to the proper structure and purpose of a poem, and is widely seen as presenting problems to the modern reader. Geoffrey invoked the musa jocosa, the playful muse, in the first lines of the Vita, and this has led most critics to see it as being intended as a light, entertaining poem, written, as F. J. E. Raby said, solely for the delight of the reader. However, some take a different view. Siân Echard has suggested that it might be "a cerebral game", sometimes grotesque but not light; Michael J. Curley considered it a reaction to the horrors of the period in which the poem was written, the Anarchy of King Stephen's reign, a picture of austerity and renunciation of the world undertaken for learning's sake; and Penelope Doob called it a "profoundly religious" poem, But A. G. Rigg found its religious outlook to be unconventional:

Historians such as Gildas or Henry of Huntingdon imposed moral patterns on their material, usually of guilt or retribution or at least of good and evil, but Geoffrey, in creating his own material, has brought the mysterious into harmony with nature, with no reference to Christian morality.

There is no agreement as to which category of poem the Vita falls into. Mark Walker has written that as a Latin poem with a British subject, an epic which deals with personal problems and domestic situations rather than warlike deeds, it cannot be placed in any genre, Peter Goodrich saw it as a comedy remarkable for the number of medieval modes of literature it includes: "Celtic folklore, political prophecies, pseudo-scientific learning, catalogues of information, and set-pieces of medieval oratory"; altogether, "a crazy quilt of styles and subjects rather than a tightly plotted narrative". Carol Harding thought it a "secular saint's life", a blending of hagiographical and more secular traditions. J. S. P. Tatlock argued that, with its disjointedness, innovation, irresponsibility and stress on entertaining the reader, it constituted "a fumbling step toward medieval romance", but had to concede that unlike most romances it has "no characterization, no love, little feeling and instinctive human truth". He also, while acknowledging that the poem has no unity, praised Geoffrey's skill in organization, alternating description with exposition, picturesque detail with swift narrative. For Nora and Hector Munro Chadwick the Vita was merely "a typical production of a literary dilettante". Ferdinand Lot wrote of the elegance of its style and the facetious bizarrerie of some of its episodes, Nikolai Tolstoy noted that there were incongruities of plot and character, but admired the poem's drama and vividness, the feeling for nature and the lively and convincing character-drawing. Robert Huntington Fletcher thought it a work of vigour, grace and poetic feeling. Basil Clarke found such vitality in its characters as provoked him to wonder what Geoffrey could have achieved as a novelist.

Praise for the versification of the Vita has been qualified. John Jay Parry conceded that it "is good, by medieval standards, and in places rises to poetry", and likewise Peter Goodrich thought it "better than average Latin hexameter verse". Tatlock wrote that it is "a favourable specimen of mediaeval metrical verse", with few false quantities, no elision or hiatus, and a moderate use of verbal jingles, though he preferred the poetic form and style of the two short poems in Geoffrey's Historia.

The figure of Merlin in the poem is hard to pin down, and has been interpreted variously by different critics. Emma Jung and Marie-Louise von Franz saw him as a priestly figure, a kind of druid or medicine man who "in complete independence and solitude, opens up a direct and personal approach to the collective unconscious for himself and tries to live the predictions of his guardian spirit, i.e. of his unconscious". Nikolai Tolstoy found him to be delicately balanced between insanity and prophetic genius. Carol Harding compared Merlin to a Christian saint, learned, withdrawn from the world, a worker of healing miracles, a hermit who becomes an example to others, resists worldly temptations and possesses supernatural knowledge and powers of prophecy; the end of Merlin's life, she wrote, is "a holy one in the sense any monk's is". For Jan Ziolkowski his nature alternates between shaman and political prophet through the poem, ending up "as ascetic and holy as a biblical prophet". Stephen Knight's view was that Geoffrey makes Merlin a figure relevant to medieval churchmen, a voice "asserting the challenge that knowledge should advise and admonish power rather than serve it". Mark Walker has written of the Vita's Merlin as a figure at home in the romantic and humanist atmosphere of 12th-century thought, so sensitive that the death of his companions can bring on a mental breakdown, who eventually becomes "a kind of Celtic Socrates", so enamoured of scientific learning that he sets up an academic community where he can discourse with scholars of his own (and Geoffrey's) turn of mind.

== Influence ==
Geoffrey intended the Vita Merlini for a small number of friends rather than a general readership, and since only seven manuscripts of it survive, as against the 217 manuscripts of the Historia Regum Britanniae, there is every reason to think that it neither reached the same wide audience as the Historia nor exercised any remotely comparable influence. Nevertheless, it did not pass unnoticed. A library catalogue written in Le Bec, Normandy, perhaps in the 1150s, draws a distinction between Merlinus Silvester and Merlinus Ambrosius, showing that the compiler had read both the Historia and the Vita and could not reconcile the Merlins depicted in them. Gerald of Wales, in his Itinerarium Cambriae (1191), made the same point, demonstrating a similar knowledge of Geoffrey's two works. Étienne de Rouen's Draco Normannicus (c. 1168) gives details of King Arthur's removal to Avalon which do not appear in the Historia, but it is uncertain whether he took them from the Vita or from oral tradition. Much the same can be said of Layamon, whose Brut (c. 1200) shows knowledge not only of Morgan's role in Arthur's survival but also of Merlin as a man living in the wilds, and of Hartmann von Aue's Erec (1190), the anonymous early-13th century Mort Artu (part of the Vulgate Cycle), and a Welsh fragment of the 14th century or earlier known as "The Birth of Arthur", all of which connect Morgen with Avalon. Another anonymous French romance of the early 13th century, the Vulgate Merlin, displays a knowledge of the Vita in its depiction of Merlin as a trickster, and its introduction of the two themes of the threefold death and the man who buys leather to patch his shoes only hours before his death. It was also suggested by Tatlock that the various romances which show Lancelot, Tristan and Yvain as love-maddened forest-dwellers take that idea from the Vita, but this theory, John Jay Parry wrote, "rests on general and unimpressive similarities".

The publication by George Ellis in 1805 of a précis of the Vita (see below) made the work available to 19th-century creative writers. One who took advantage of this was the poet and hymn-writer Reginald Heber, whose Fragments of the Masque of Gwendolen (written in 1816, published posthumously in 1830) drew on several medieval Arthurian sources, and took the character of Gwendolen from the Vita. Another was Ludwig Uhland, a figure in the German Romantic movement. He retold the Vita's story in his ballad Merlin der Wilde (1829), portraying Merlin as deriving his power from the forest and the forces of nature. Laurence Binyon's The Madness of Merlin (1947) is another posthumously published fragment, based primarily on the Vita but also on the Myrddin and Lailoken traditions, and with new characters of Binyon's own invention. He described this work as a "dialogue arranged as story rather than drama". Mary Stewart's novel The Last Enchantment (1979), the last of a trilogy narrated by Merlin, took material from many sources; the Vita Merlini contributed to it Merlin's delirious retreat to the forest and the incident of the doomed boy whose shoes need patching. The New Age writer John Matthews has retold the Vita as "The Life of Merlin". Finally, the American academic Jerry Hunter's Welsh-language novel Gwenddydd (2010) takes the story of Gwenddydd and Myrddin from the earliest Welsh poems and the Vita Merlini, and transposes it to the Second World War, Myrddin becoming a soldier suffering from PTSD who escapes from a military hospital and reunites with his sister Gwen in the family's home village. It won the Prose Medal at the 2010 National Eisteddfod of Wales.

== Manuscripts ==
The Vita Merlini survives in seven manuscripts, all now held by the British Library. The only complete text is in Cotton Vespasian E iv, a manuscript of the late 13th century. Three manuscripts of Ranulf Higden's Polychronicon include a truncated version of the Vita, inserted between the years 525 and 533; these are Harley 655 (late 14th century), Royal 13 E i (c. 1380), and Cotton Julius E viii (c. 1400). Another truncated version, in Cotton Titus A xix (15th century), seems to have been copied from a Polychronicon manuscript. Two sets of extracts from the prophecies in the Vita appear in Cotton Cleopatra C iv (late 15th century) and Harley 6148 (early 17th century).

== Editions ==
By the beginning of the 19th century, the Vita Merlini had been rediscovered by the antiquary Joseph Ritson, who sent his own manuscript copy of the poem to Walter Scott and planned to produce an edition of it himself. This project never came to fruition, but Scott's friend George Ellis included a thirteen-page detailed synopsis of the Vita in his Specimens of Early English Metrical Romances (1805). The published editions are as follows:

- Black, William Henry, ed. (1830). Gaufridi Arthurii Archidiaconi, postea vero episcopi Asaphensis, de vita et vaticiniis Merlini Calidonii carmen heroicum. London: Roxburghe Club. Prints Ellis's summary as its introduction, but is otherwise unannotated.
- Michel, Francisque, ed. (1837). Galfridi de Monemuta Vita Merlini. Parisiis: Firmin Didot. Criticized by Parry as derivative from Black's edition.
- Gfroerer, A. F., ed. (1840). Prophetae Veteres pseudepigraphi partim ex abyssinico vel hebraico sermonibus latine versi. Stuttgardiae: Adolphum Krabbe. pp. 363–412. The text largely follows Michel's edition.
- San-Marte (1853). Die Sagen von Merlin. Halle: Verlag der Buchhandlung des Waisenhauses. pp. 268–339. The text is based on Michel's, but with a number of additional errors.
- Parry, John Jay (1925). The Vita Merlini. University of Illinois Studies in Language and Literature. Vol. X, no. 3. Urbana: University of Illinois. The first edition with a full critical apparatus, based on a thorough collation of all manuscripts. It is a parallel-text edition, including the first English translation.
- Faral, Edmond (1929). La Légende arthurienne, études et documents. Première partie: Les plus anciens textes. Vol. 3. Paris: H. Champion. pp. 307–352. A single-manuscript edition in classical spelling. The commentary appears in volume 2.
- Clarke, Basil, ed. (1973). Life of Merlin: Vita Merlini. Cardiff: University of Wales Press. ISBN 978-0708305201. The text is essentially based on Parry's. Includes a new English translation, a substantial introduction, and copious annotation.
- Walter, Philippe, ed. (1999). Le devin maudit. Merlin, Lailoken, Suibhne. Textes et études. Grenoble: ELLUG. pp. 49–171. ISBN 978-2843100185. The edition of the Vita Merlini in this volume is by Christine Bord and Jean-Charles Berthet.

== Translations ==
- Parry, John Jay (1925). The Vita Merlini. University of Illinois Studies in Language and Literature. Vol. X, no. 3. Urbana: University of Illinois.
- Clarke, Basil, ed. (1973). Life of Merlin: Vita Merlini. Cardiff: University of Wales Press. ISBN 978-0708305201.
- Stewart, R. J. (1986). The Mystic Life of Merlin. London: Arkana. pp. 23–25, 35–37, 43–45, 55–58, 65–67, 77–80, 89–91, 97–98, 107–108, 114–120, 137–140, 144–145, 147–148, 151–153, 155–158. ISBN 978-1850630425. An abridged translation.
- Geoffrey of Monmouth (2008). The History of the Kings of Britain. Translated by Faletra, Michael A. Peterborough, Ont.: Broadview. pp. 242–276. ISBN 9781551116396.
- Skupin, Michael (2009). Merlin, Merlin, Merlin. Taipei: Showwe Information. pp. 257–367. ISBN 9789862212196.
- Walker, Mark (2011). Geoffrey of Monmouth's Life of Merlin: A New Verse Translation. Stroud: Amberley. ISBN 9781445601786.
