= Arthuret =

Civil parish in Cumbria, England

Coordinates: 55°01′N 02°55′W

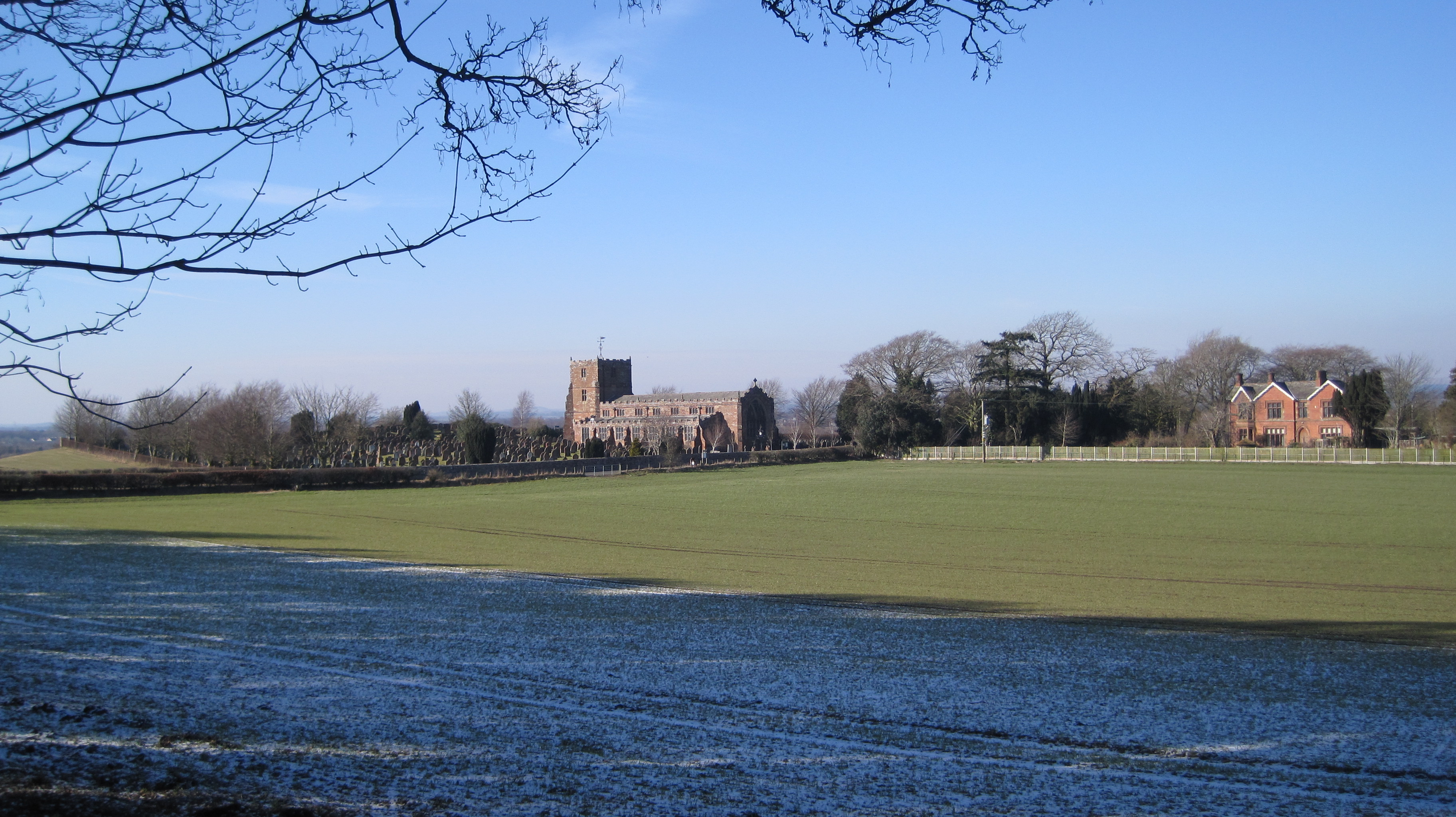
St Michael's Church within the parish of Arthuret

Arthuret is a civil parish in Cumbria, England. According to the 2001 census it had a population of 2,434, increasing to 2,471 at the 2011 census. The parish includes the town of Longtown and the village of Easton. It is bounded by the River Esk to the west and the River Lyne to the south.

== Toponymy ==
The interpretation of the name Arthuret has presented problems. The name can possibly be associated with the battle of Armterid recorded in the mid-10th century Welsh Annales Cambriae as having taken place in c. 573; Armterid (spelt Arfderydd in Modern Welsh) is composed of arm-, perhaps meaning "arms, weapon" (arf in Modern Welsh, borrowed ultimately from Latin arma, "arms, armour") – or perhaps an Old Welsh cognate of Old Irish airm meaning 'place' – and a second element terid "ardent, fierce; flaming, blazing; fast, nimble, swift" (terydd in Modern Welsh, a loan from Latin torridus, "scorched, parched, burned"). However, "... it seems safer to leave the interpretation of 'Armterid' an open question."

== Arthurian connections ==
The site of the church overlooks a suggested site of the Battle of Arfderydd, fought in 573 A.D., mention of which appears in Geoffrey of Monmouth's Vita Merlini and also in the Annales Cambriae (written c. 1100 A.D. where it appears as 'Bellum armterid'). The battle took place very early in the reign of the King of Strathclyde, Rhydderch Hael, (patron of St. Kentigern, and Myrddin's supposed brother-in-law), between the warlord Gwenddoleu ap Ceidio and his cousins Peredur and Gwrgi, Princes of either Ebrauc (modern York), or possibly from Gwynedd. In this battle, Gwenddoleu lost his life, and it is not known if one of his brothers, Nudd and Caw, survived to succeed him as king of Arfderydd afterwards.

In this battle Myrddin killed his nephew (by his sister Gwenddydd, wife of King Rhydderch Hael), who was fighting on the opposing side. This act drove Myrddin mad and he spent the rest of his life roaming the Forests of Celyddon (Glennie 1869). 140 other men of rank suffered battle-madness and perished in these woods (Rich & Begg 1991).

In the Black Book of Carmarthen is recorded a poem which takes the form of a dialogue between Myrddin and the Welsh bard Taliesin (Skene 1988); it records how Myrddin wore a gold torque and tells of his grief at the death of King Gwenddolau. The battle is said to have lasted six weeks and three hundred men were killed and buried nearby. It was one of the three futile battles of Britain, fought over a lark's nest.

== Arthuret Church ==
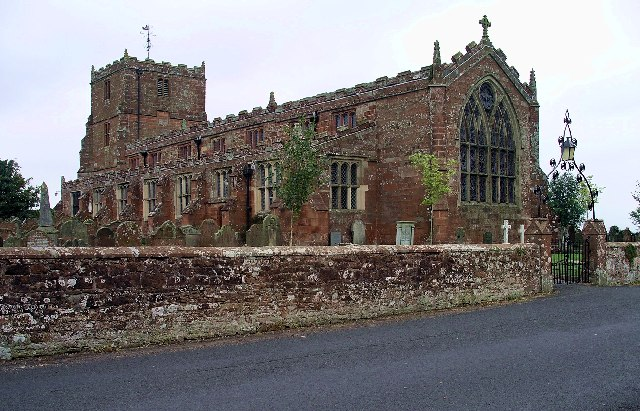
Arthuret Church, south of Longtown.

St Michael and All Angels' Church is situated a mile or so to the south of Longtown, to the west of the A7 and overlooking the River Esk.

The church tower stones are unusual in that many of them have masons' marks which are clearly visible. This church was built as a result of a national fundraising ordered by James I and VI in 1607 because the existing church had been frequently devastated by Scots reivers/raiders, and to benefit the parishioners who were mainly rejecting Christ's teachings. (James also employed more direct methods of improving the morals of the area, hanging notable reivers from both sides of the Border and deporting the Grahams of the Esk valley en masse to Ireland.) Part of the sum was stolen and this delayed the construction of the new church.

A holy well is located on the edge of the mound. It is a well-built structure, with stone canopy and steps. It was still used for baptisms until the 1970s.

The current clergyman of the church is the Reverend Brett Murphy.

== Netherby Hall ==
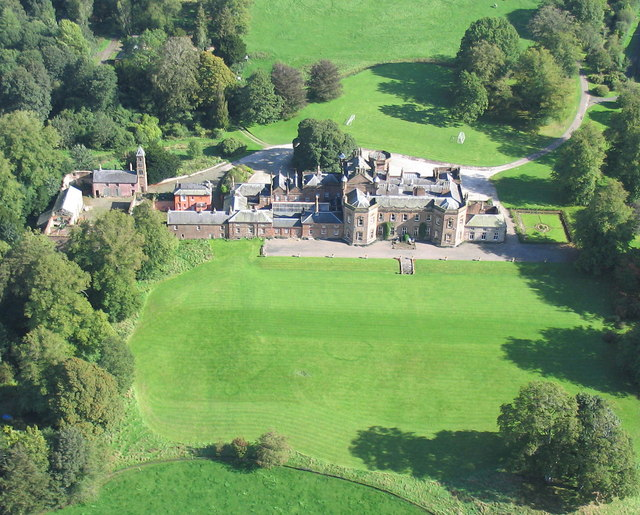
Aerial view of Netherby Hall, Cumbria

Netherby Hall, the historic home of the Graham family, is a Grade II* listed mansion. It stands upon the site of the Roman fort of Castra Exploratorum. Its nucleus is a 15th-century pele tower, extended or altered in 1639 for Sir Richard Graham and enclosed by extensive later additions to the house (in the late 18th century), with further extensions taking place in 1833 for Sir James Graham l by William Burn. The original pele tower is thought to have been built with stone from the Roman fort, but the remains of the fort and its vicus noted by Tudor antiquarians have been obliterated by the later extensions of the Hall.

In October 1592 the Scottish rebel Earl of Bothwell, his wife Margaret Douglas, and the Laird of Burleigh stayed at Netherby with Walter Graham and played cards and football.

The Netherby Estate, owned by the Graham family for 400 years, extends over a large area of the parish along the Scottish border. A Gothick folly known as the Coop House was probably built about 1772 as an adornment to the estate. Coop House is now leased by the Landmark Trust.

Since 2014, the Estate has been owned by Gerald and Margo Smith. A restoration of the stables and walled garden that commenced in 2016 was completed. As of 2023, holiday lets were available "above the stables, in the garden bothies and lodge cottages".

== Notable people ==
- Clement Moody, Vicar of Newcastle, clergyman, theologian, classical scholar, and freemason
- Colonel Thomas Moody, Kt., Colonial Office expert and Commander of the Royal Engineers in the West Indies

== See also ==
- Listed buildings in Arthuret

== Bibliography ==
- Begg, Ean & Rich, Deike (1991). On the Trail of Merlin. ISBN 0-85030-939-5
- Glennie, John S. Stuart (1869). Arthurian Localities. Edinburgh. p. 68.
- Mack, James Logan (1926). The Border Line. Edinburgh: Oliver and Boyd. p. 51.
- W. F. Skene. (ed. Derek Bryce) (1988) Arthur and the Britons in Wales and Scotland Lampeter, Dyfed: Llanerch Enterprises. 1988,ISBN 0-947992-23-5.
