= Cyfoesi Myrddin a Gwenddydd ei Chwaer =

Medieval Welsh poem

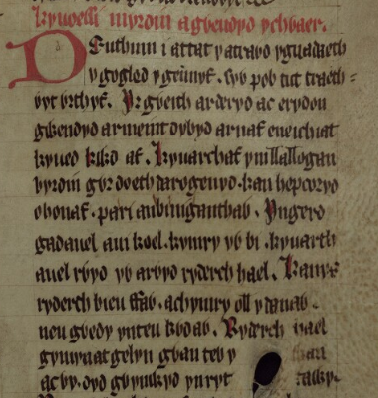
The opening of Cyfoesi Myrddin a Gwenddydd ei Chwaer in the Red Book of Hergest

Cyfoesi Myrddin a Gwenddydd ei Chwaer ("The Conversation of Myrddin and His Sister Gwenddydd") is an anonymous Middle Welsh poem of uncertain date consisting of 136 stanzas, mostly in englyn form. Myrddin, the legendary 6th-century North British bard and warrior, is depicted as being encouraged by his sister Gwenddydd to utter a series of prophecies detailing the future history of the kings of Gwynedd, leading up to an apocalyptic ending. The mood of the poem has been described as "one of despair and of loss of faith and trust in this world".

== Synopsis ==
The poem concerns the 6th-century figures Myrddin and Gwenddydd, who are presented as brother and sister with a friendly and harmonious relationship. Reference is made to the death of Gwenddolau at the battle of Arfderydd and Myrddin's consequent descent into madness, and to the 6th-century kings Rhydderch Hael, Morgant Fawr, and Urien Rheged, but otherwise the poem largely consists of prophecies of the far future spoken by Myrddin in response to questions by Gwenddydd. These prophecies begin by tracing the line of descent from Maelgwn Gwynedd down to the 10th-century king Hywel Dda and beyond. Then follows a series of stanzas whose meaning is obscure, though there may be references to Llywelyn ap Iorwerth and to Henry II and his sons. There is a messianic passage in which Owain, Beli, Cadwaladr and Cyndaf return in triumph, then a last deluge and the end of all kingship. Myrddin predicts his own death, and he and his sister commend each other to God.

== Manuscripts ==
Cyfoesi Myrddin a Gwenddydd ei Chwaer survives in two manuscripts: the Red Book of Hergest (Oxford, Jesus College, MS 111), which dates from the last quarter of the 14th century or the first quarter of the 15th; and Aberystwyth, National Library of Wales, MS Peniarth 20, which dates from the first half of the 14th century.

== Date ==
There is very wide disagreement as to the poem's date. A. O. H. Jarman took the view that its core could have been composed as early as the 9th or 10th century, but that it had been added to later. Kenneth Hurlstone Jackson, followed by Rachel Bromwich, dated it on linguistic grounds to the 10th or 11th century. Oliver Padel cast doubt on the linguistic evidence for an early date and suggested that it could have been written about the middle of the 12th century or a little later. John Bollard rejected the theory that the poem had grown by accretion and instead assigned it to the 13th century, while acknowledging that it made use of much older traditions.

== Analogues ==
The poem stands in a tradition of medieval Welsh works about a wild man in north Britain, but the precise relationship between these works is contested. Among several prophetic poems associated with the name of Myrddin, two, Yr Oianau and Y Bedwenni have at points verbal similarities to the Cyfoesi. Other Myrddin poems also resemble the Cyfoesi in making repeated reference to Myrddin's fall into madness and to Gwenddolau's death at Arfderydd. The figure of Myrddin may be identical with a madman called Lailoken who appears in Jocelyn of Furness's Life of St Kentigern. In what could be a direct reference to the Lailoken legend, Gwenddydd several times refers to Myrddin in the Cyfoesi as llallawc, though this word may simply be Middle Welsh for "lord" or "friend". The general situation described in the Cyfoesi, in which Gwenddydd elicits prophecies of future kings from her brother, closely resembles several passages in Geoffrey of Monmouth's Vita Merlini, and there are also parallels with the early Irish poems Baile in Scáil and Baile Chuind.

== Legacy ==
The writer John Cowper Powys used the Gwenddydd of Cyfoesi Myrddin a Gwenddydd as the basis of his Gwendydd, sister of Myrddin, in his Porius (1951), a historical novel set in the year 499. She has been described as "one of the most memorable minor characters".

The American academic Jerry Hunter's Welsh-language novel Gwenddydd [cy] (2010) takes the story of Gwenddydd and Myrddin from the Vita Merlini, Cyfoesi Myrddin a Gwenddydd, and other early Myrddin poems, and transposes it to the Second World War, Myrddin becoming a soldier suffering from PTSD who escapes from a military hospital and reunites with his sister Gwen in the family's home village. It won the Prose Medal at the 2010 National Eisteddfod of Wales, and has been called "an important contribution to war literature in Wales".

== Editions ==
- Evans, J. Gwenogvryn, ed. (1911). The Poetry in the Red Book of Hergest. Llanbedrog: p.p.
- Williams, Ifor (1924). "Y Cyfoesi a'r Afallennau yn Peniarth 3". Bulletin of the Board of Celtic Studies (in Welsh). 4: 112–129.
- Jenkins, Manon Bonner (1990). Aspects of the Welsh prophetic verse tradition in the Middle Ages: incorporating textual studies of poetry from 'Llyfr Coch Hergest' (Oxford, Jesus College, MS cxi) and 'Y Cwta Cyfarwydd' (Aberystwyth, National Library of Wales, MS Peniarth 50) (Ph.D.). University of Cambridge.

== Modern translations ==
- Bollard, John K. (1990). "Myrddin in early Welsh tradition". In Goodrich, Peter (ed.). The Romance of Merlin: An Anthology. New York: Garland. pp. 31–46. ISBN 0824070429.
- Matthews, John (1995). "The poems of Merlin". In Stewart, R. J.; Matthews, John (eds.). Merlin Through the Ages: A Chronological Anthology and Source Book. London: Blandford. pp. 32–38. ISBN 0713724668.
