= Myrddin (disambiguation) =

Myrddin is Myrddin Wyllt, a figure in medieval Welsh legend.

Myrddin may also refer to:

- Myrddin (Stargate), a character in the Stargate fictional universe
- Myrddin Emrys, or Merlin, a legendary figure in Arthurian legend
- Myrddin Fardd (1836–1921), Welsh writer
- Myrddin ap Dafydd (born 1956), Welsh writer and publisher

== See also ==
- Clas Myrddin, or Merlin's Enclosure, an early name for Great Britain
