= Myrddin Wyllt =

Welsh poet and astrologer (b. 540 CE)

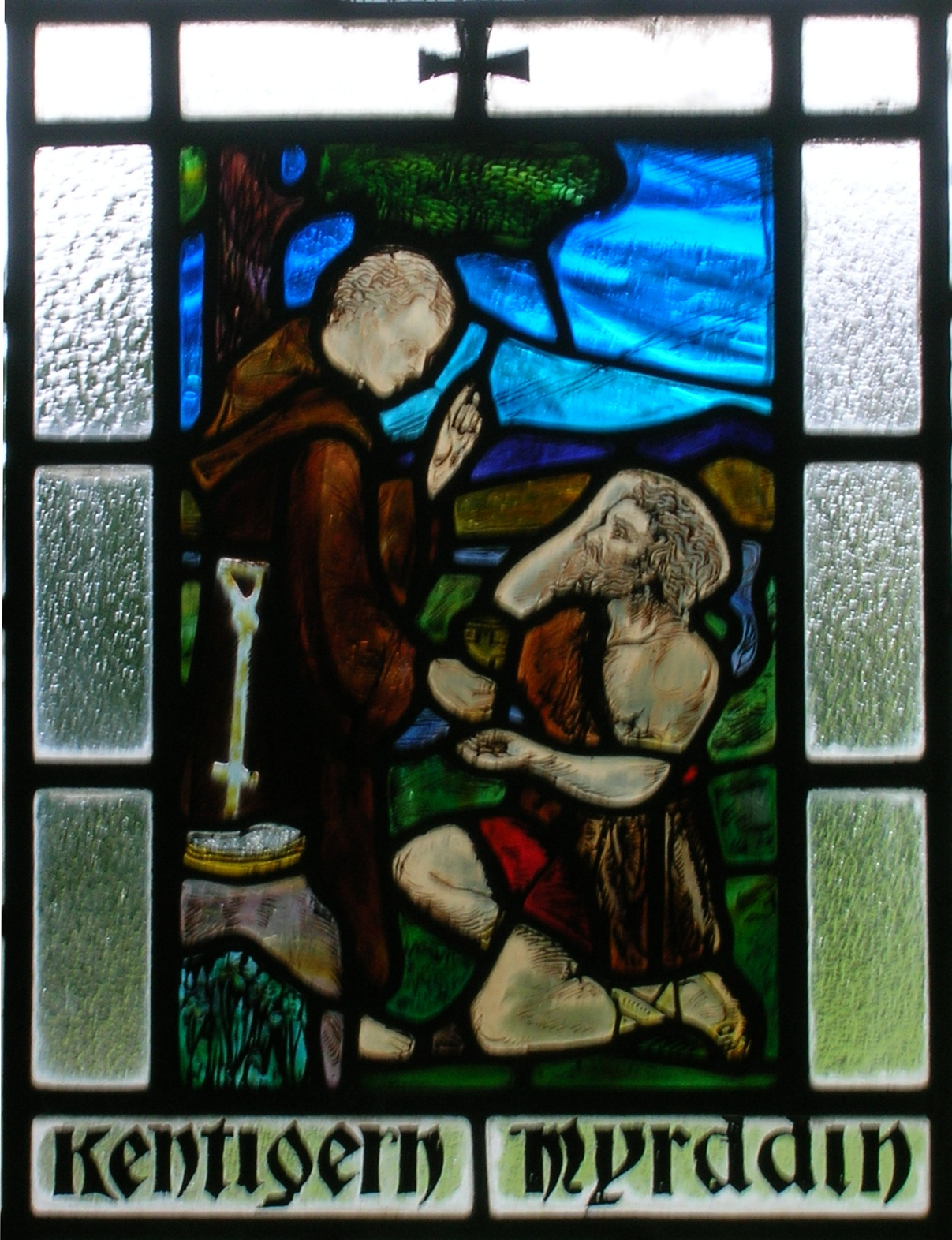
- Myrddin and St. Kentigern (Stobo Kirk, Scotland)
- Born: Carmarthen
- Known for: Prophet and madman in Welsh legend; served as the inspiration for Merlin in Arthurian legend

Myrddin Wyllt (Welsh: [ˈmərðɪn ˈwɨɬt]—"Myrddin the Wild", Cornish: Merdhyn Gwyls, Breton: Marzhin Gouez) is a figure in Welsh mythology and Medieval Welsh literature. He is accounted a chief bard, the speaker of several poems in The Black Book of Carmarthen and The Red Book of Hergest.

The nickname Myrddin Wyllt (the "wild" or "mad" Myrddin) was applied to the figure at some later time, by the cywyddwyr bards before 1500, and by Elis Gruffydd (1490–1552) in his chronicle.

Although Myrddin of Welsh legend was originally unconnected to King Arthur in earlier Welsh tradition, Myrddin was reinvented as Merlin, Arthurian court magician, by Geoffrey of Monmouth, and Myrddin became indistinguishable with Merlin in later Welsh literature. Although Geoffrey considered the Merlin of his Historia Regum Britanniae and his later work Vita Merlini to be the same person at different stages of his life, this view was opposed by Gerald of Wales (Itinerarium Cambriae II.viii) who considered Merlinus Ambrosius (Myrddin Emrys) to be separate from Merlinus Celidonius, also known as Merlinus Sylvester (Note: "Merlin of the woods") (equivalent of Myrddin Wyllt).

Although his legend centres on the Celtic wild man theme, Myrddin's legend is rooted in history, for he is said to have gone mad after the Battle of Arfderydd (Arthuret) at which Rhydderch Hael of Strathclyde defeated the Brythonic king Gwenddoleu. According to the Annales Cambriae this took place in 573. Myrddin fled into the forest, lived with the beasts and received the gift of prophecy.

Myrddin Wyllt's legend closely resembles that of a north-British figure called Lailoken, which appears in Jocelyn of Furness' 12th-century Life of Kentigern. Scholars differ as to the independence or identity of Lailoken and Myrddin, though there is more agreement as to Myrddin's original independence from later Welsh legends. A 15th century version, the Vita Merlini Silvestris section I (aka "Lailoken and Kentigerni") identifies Lailoken as Myrddin, and localizes the occurrence of his triple death at River Tweed in the village of Drumelzier, and claims Lailoken/Myrddin designated a plot near it to be his burial place, in section II of the work (aka "Lailoken and Meldred").

In later Welsh tradition (14th or 15th century), Myrddin was reputed to have built a House of Glass for the sake of his beloved, then trapped inside, approximately paralleling French accounts in the Post-Vulgate and Vulgate version of Merlin written in French. Around the 16th century, this Glass House was regarded as the showcase "museum" which held the Thirteen Treasures of the Island of Britain, saved from destruction at Caerleon;' also around the 16th century, the Glass House became localized at Bardsey (Welsh: Ynys Enlli).

== Nomenclature ==
The nickname Myrddin Wyllt (meaning "the Wild" or "Insane" (Note: Cf. mod. Welsh: gwyllt, "wild".)) appears to be of later Welsh origin. (Note: Tatlock (1943), p. 273, note 2. Tatlock for one example, refers to mention of "Ymddiddan myrddin wyllt" in Havod MS. 5, (mostly in a hand dated 1586) given by Evans, pp. 307-308) And while it occurs in the Ysdori Merddin Wylld ("Story of Myrddin Wyllt") in the chronicle of Elis Gruffydd (1490–1552), there are earlier attestations, e.g., an interpolation in the Black Book of Carmarthen (c. 1250), though written in a late hand, (Note: Jones ed. (1959), p. 319 notes that in the BBC (Evans ed. (1906), p. 46, line 20-, = fol. 23b) occurs the mention of "Merddin wyllt hagr onvyllt haint / am Mhorfryn amau hirfraint".) and usage by the cywyddwyr ("nobility of poetry") poets Guto'r Glyn (c. 1412 – c. 1493) (Note: Guto'r Glyn: "Merddin wyllt am ei urddass.." (GGl no. LIII. 63) apud Bromwich (2014), p. 461) and Ieuan Dyfi (c. 1461? – after 1502?). (Note: Ieuan Dyfi: "Merddin Wyllt am ryw ddyn wyf.. HCLl no. LVIII.I ff. apud Bromwich (2014), p. 461)

== Welsh literature ==
Before Geoffrey of Monmouth in 12th century, Myrddin was a relatively minor character unconnected with Arthur, and not much commonality with Merlin beyond both of them being prophets. Although no cohesive prose version of the Welsh Myrddin legend survives from before that time, it can be largely reconstructed based on a group of Middle Welsh poems containing some material considered much older than their redaction in the 13th or 14th century.

The Armes Prydein (10th cent., one of the earliest mentions of him) preserved in the Book of Taliesin (first half of the 14th century) contains the line “Myrddin foretells that they will meet”, and if accepted (Note: i.e., if the possibility of a later scribe interpolating or substituting the name of Myrddin into the BT can be completely ruled out), Myrddin was already recognised as a prophet alongside Taliesin by the 10th or 11th century. The notice of Myrddin possessing the gwenwawt ("prophetic and poetic gift") Y Gododdin A, perhaps as old or even older, though this too is uncertain, for this mention is wanting in the B text making it less certain this was attested in the oldest redaction.

On the name Myrddin Wyllt, the byname is modern Welsh gwyllt "wild, mad", and somewhat attested as gwylleith "madness" in the Middle Welsh poem Yr Afallennau. The adjective is cognate to Middle Irish gelt or modern Irish geilt.

=== The Black Book of Carmarthen ===
Yr Afallennau ("The Apple-trees") from the Black Book of Carmarthen (abbrev. BBC, <1250) begins with the supposed narrator Myrddin (not explicitly named) addressing the "sweet apple-tree" that grows in Coed Celyddon (Celidon, or Caledonian Forest (Note: Rather than to equate the Coed Celyddon to the Caledonian Forest entirely (as do Chadwick & Chadwick (2010), p. 125 and Jarman (2020), p. 118), Skene narrows down Coed Celyddon to be "the forests of Selkirk and Ettrick, the scene of Arthur's seventh battle" (i.e., among the battles in Historia Brittonum) (index), i.e., that part of Hen Gogledd including Ettrick Forest and Tweeddale.)) which is where Myrddin dwells; he is ruminating over the fifty years living a madman in the forest, ever since the Battle of Arfderydd (of year 573 (Note: According to Annales Cambriae.)), when his lord Gwenddoleu ap Ceidio was killed by the "lords of Rhidderch" (Rhidderch Hael, [Welsh] king of Strathclyde, now part of Scotland)

While it may be surmised Rhydderch had led this attack in battle, other commentators make the point that Rhydderch's involvement in the battle is not explicit in the poems or the Triads, (Note: Though in a later passage, the Chadwick say Rhydderch's participation in the battle was possible.) and in fact, Triad 44 (among the Triads of the Horses) names Gwenddoleu's adversaries in the battle as the sons of Eliffer, Gwrgi and Peredur, also Dunawd and Cynfelyn (while some tradition names only the first two sons, (Note: The genealogical tract Bonedd Gwŷr y Gogledd) other traditions say Eliffer had seven sons), coinciding with Annales Cambriae stating that the sons of Elifer/Eliver confronted Guendoleu in the Bellum Armterid of year 573.

There are the lines in this Yr Afallennau stating that Myrddin has lost the love of Gwenddydd (his sister), incurred the hatred of the supporter of Rhydderch, having "ruined his son and daughter". The bold interpretation given of this by the Chadwicks was that Myrddin had killed his sister's son sired by Rhydderch, (Note: Chadwick & Chadwick (2010), p. 125: "The Vita.. gives no hint Merlin has killed Ganieda's son", implying that the Welsh poem does allude to such murder.) (as Merlin's sister is in fact married to King Rodarch (Rhydderch's counterpart) in Vita Merlini (Note: Though problematically, Jocelyn's Vita Sancti Kentigerni gives a different name to Rhydderch's queen.)). The older translation had dropped the name of Gwasawg given to this supporter in the poem, as discovered by A. O. H. Jarman, (Note: Where Skene tr. (1868), p. 371 gave "firmest supporter", Jarman supplied Gwasawg.) opening up the possibility that this Gwasawg was Merlin's sister's husband, and that at any rate, "Gwenddtyd was hostile to Myrddin because of the loss of her son and daughter through him", according to Basil Clarke. However, Jarman himself only conceded a much more conservative and vague interpretation, noting that Myrddin had somehow "angered" Gwasawg the supporter "by some obscure event".

In Yr Oianau ("The Greetings"), the narrator Myrddin addresses a pig, and cautions it to beware "Lest Rydderch Hael and his cunning dogs should come.." (stanza 12), thus comparing the pig's danger to his own fugitive circumstance ("sleeplessness" in the night and the cold "icicles in my hair" due to his fear of Rhydderch, stanza 10); other tidbits make reference to the Battle of Arfderydd, but the amount of legend material here is scarce, as the bulk of the work is taken up by prophecies.

A third poetical source from the Black Book, Ymddiddan Myrddin a Thaliesin ("The Dialogue of Myrddin and Taliesin"), unlike the other poems, literally attests to Myrddin by name. In the first 22 of 38 lines (up to middle of VIth stanzas out of XI), the two figures discuss the historical invasion of Dyfed by the forces of Maelgwn Gwynedd (d. 547), naming contemporaneous heroes on each side, but this part is unconnected with the wild man legend. The poem then has Myrddin supposedly predicting the Battle of Arfderydd in the future, but the legendary material here is "tenuous". The last stanza tells of the routed pagan enemy party fleeing to the forest of Celyddon.

The Bedwenni ("Birch-trees") is yet a fourth relevant poem in the BBC, where Myrddin is not named, but is the supposed narrator, as is the case with Yr Afallennau and Yr Oianau.

=== Conversation with sister ===
In the Cyfoesi Myrddin a Gwenddydd ei Chwaer ("The Conversation of Myrddin and his Sister Gwenddydd") from the Red Book of Hergest, Myrddin expresses to his sister the familiar distresses owing to the battle, but the poem also intimates some sort of past estrangement between Myrddin and his sister Gwenddydd, turning towards reconciliation and concern for him.

In the Cyfoesi, stanza III, the sister refers to Myrddin as Llallogan meaning "twin brother", (Note: She also repeatedly calls him llallaỽc (mod. Welsh: llallawg) "the other [party]" of the same etymology. The term Lallogan can be construed as diminutive form m and could also just mean "friend", or "fellow, comrade".) and translated as such. This serves as a hint that the idiot prophet Lailoken of Scottish sources (cf. § Scottish literature below) is actually Myrddin. (Note: The Myvyrian Archaiology of Wales, 2nd ed., pp. 108–115 apud Lloyd, "Myrddub Wyllt" in DNB.)

Other sources suggest Gwenddydd was Myrddin's mistress rather than sister.

The Cyfoesi contains prophesies and instructions by Myrddin concerning the succession of Welsh rulers.

=== Myrddin in the Grave ===
In Gwasgargerdd Fyrddin yn y Bedd ("Separation song of Myrddin in the Grave" or "The Diffused Song~", "The Widespread-Song~" (Note: Skene concedes that the straightforward meaning of gwasgargerdd is a "song of scattering" (as is defined by Pughe) or song of diffusing, but considers it more likely here to mean "a song composed of scattered or unconnected subjects",)), Merlin is presumably now dead, and therefore perhaps this poem forms a sequel to the Cyfoesi, which foreshadows Merlin's death. But it is pointed out this poem is standalone in the White Book of Rhydderch.

Myrddin from the grave predicts Wales being taken over by the Norman invasion, and infers William Rufus (coch Normandy) among them. The poem also mentions Henry I's march in 1114 to subdue the Welsh king Gruffudd ap Cynan, and the prophet predicts wishfully that eventually the "Britons will overcome".

This poem's conclusion is also seen as mentioning the figure Gwasawg in the company of Gwendydd, though again the older translation does not construe a name, Gwasawg, and renders it as the adjective "Servile". Also near the start of this poem (stanza II), Myrddin is referred to as "son of Morfryn".

=== Father ===
As for Myrddin's father Morfryn/Morvryn, his name occurs in the patronymic (Myrddin fab Morvryn) in Cyfoesi, stanza CII,, (Note: Cyvoesi: "myrdin vab moru(r)yn geluyd", in RBP col. 582.37 = Poetry from the Red Book of Hergest edited by J. G. Evans, apud Bromwich (2014), p. 458, also cited by Jones ed. (1959), p. 325, n1 as RP 582.37.) Gwasgargerd[d] ("Song of scattering of [Myrddin in the Grave]". (Note: Gwasgargerd: "myrdin yv vy env uab moruryn", in RBP col. 584.5–6 apud Bromwich (2014), p. 458, also cited by Jones ed. (1959), p. 325, n1 as RP 584.5–6.) "Myrddin ap Morfryn" is also mentioned in Peirian Faban/Peiryan Vaban ("Commanding youth"), (Note: Jarman ed. (1951a) "Peiryan Vaban" in Bulletin of the Board of Celtic Studies 14, cited as B XIV, p.105, l. 28 by Bromwich. Cf. also Jarman (2020), p. 120) which occurs in MS. Peniarth 50, and was omitted by Skene, who edited and translated almost all of the poetical Myrddin material.

Myrddin's father is also named in the "note in a late hand in BBC", i.e., the later added inscription attesting to the nickname Myrddin Wyllt in the Black Book, already mentioned above (§ Nomenclature).

The patronymic with Morfryn as father also occurs in the triads, i.e. Triad 87 of the "Three Skilful Bards.. at Arthur's Court", naming Myrddin fab Morvryn, Myrddyn Emrys, and Taliesin (cf. also Merlinus Emrys under § Three Merlins below). (Note: Bromwich (1978), p. 214 "87. Tri Bardd Kaw oedd yn Llys Arthur: / Myrddyn vab Morvryn, / Myrddyn Embrys. / A Thaliessin".)

Bromwich notes that this Myrddin—Morfryn lineage is not attested in any of the northern genealogies. (Note: Bromwich (1978), note to "Myrddin Wyllt", p.471 (pp. 469–474) and 2014 edition, p. 458.) In Geoffrey's Historia of course, Merlin had no human father (but was sired by an incubus).

=== Brothers ===
In the Battle of Arfderydd, alongside Gwenddoleu there were also slain Llwelyn, Gwgawn, Einiawn, and Rhiwallawn, the sons of Morfryn, thus Myrddin's brothers ("Merlin Caledonius's brethren"), according to Robert Vaugn (d. 1667) based on some source he had accessed, but which has not been passed down to posterity. (Note: Bromwich, note to Triad 84, quoting Vaughn, Robert, notes to Trioedd Ynys Prydein in NLW MS. 7857DD (sigla VN^{1}) via VN^{2} (Copy by Evan Evans, d. 1688), Panton MS. 51, fol. 116r. 116v.) The names of these men also appear in the aforementioned poem Peirian Faban/Peirian Vaban ("Commanding youth") from the 15th century Peniarth 50 manuscript. (Note: Jarman ed. (1951a), p. 150, Peirian Faban ll. 50–51, cited by Bromwich)

Meanwhile, John Carey hypothesizes that Morgenau, Morien, and Morial/Mordaf in Cyfoesi might be a listing the names of Myrddin's brothers, as their deaths are sufficiently aggrieving to Gwenddydd to be uttered next to Myrddin's (impending) death. And Gwenddydd calling Myrddin her "only brother" could more sensibly be construed to mean that Myrddin had become her only surviving brother, according to Carey's hypothesis.

=== Merlin's house of glass ===
Welsh tradition from around the 15th century (or earlier) held that Myrddin built a House of Glass (Tŷ Gwydr) for his beloved, as Dafydd ap Gwilym (d. c. 1370) has alluded to this in his lines "Modd y gwnaeth, saerniaeth serch Merddin dy gwydr a ordderch".

Commentary from the start of the 19th century explains that Merddin Emrys (Merlin Ambrosius) removed himself to the glass house on Bardsey (Welsh: Ynys Enlli) for the sake of his beloved, but the ultimate source of this in no more clear than a note in the March 1806 issue of the short-lived Y Greal magazine, edited by William Owen Pughe. (Note: Also Y Greal, p. 188, cited by John Owen Williams (Pedrog) (1860) in Y Brython, p. 373, where Y Brython is in turn cited by Ford (1976), p. 384, n17.) The localization to Bardsey occurred around the 16th century, as had the connection between the Glass House with the treasures of Britain (cf. § Thirteen Treasures below).

==== Gruffydd's version ====
Elis Gruffydd's tract "Death of Myrddin" (or O Varuolaeth Merddin, "Of the Death of Myrddin"), despite its title, describes how Myrddin was imprisoned in the Glass House (Tŷ Gwydr; by the Lady of the Lake. According to the Welsh legend, Myrddin fell in love with a certain noble maid around Glyn Galabes, and built a "house of glass" (ty o wydyr) on Ynys Wydrin (the "Glassy Isle") which is "in a milldam beside the Perilous Bridge (Middle Welsh: bontt beryglus; Welsh: pont peryglus) in Gloucestershire (Middle Welsh: Sir Gairloyw; Welsh: Sir Caerloyw)". This was supposed to be their love nest, but the girl perceived it to be magically sealed building, and prevailed upon Myrddin to enter first, and shut him in, causing the whole structure to disappear from the world. Gruffydd adduces this girl was no doubt the Lady of the Lake (Arglwyddes o'r Llyn) of French Romance, who was the foster mother to Lancelot of the Lake. The Welsh version vaguely matches the Vulgate Estoire de Merlin account, where Merlin's mistress Viviane imprisons him by use of magic, without tower or wall or any such enclosure. in Post-Vulgate Merlin Continuation (aka Suite Merlin or Huth Merlin), where the mistress is a Lady of the Lake, also called Niviene or Niniane, and she traps Merlin inside a marble tomb: after laying a paralyzing spell, bringing in henchmen to deposit the body and replace the heavy stone lid, having robbed Merlin of his powers (for with magic he could have moved such stone). Malory presents a parallel version, closer to the Post-Vulgate.

Elis Gruffydd muses in a postscript that he finds it remarkably "strange" to read that the wise Myrddin was so gullibly deceived by his student, but there are other opinions, that Merlin was a spirit, and after appearing in the days of Arthur (5th cent.), reincarnated as Taliesin (6th cent.), and much later a third time as Myrddin Wyllt in the days of Morfryn Frych son of Esyllt (9th cent., Merfyn Frych son of Ethyllt ferch Cynan)

For additional Myrddin material compiled by Gruffydd in the 16th century, cf. § Elis Gruffydd below.

==== Thirteen Treasures ====
Welsh tradition associating the House of Glass as the safehouse where Myrddin carried the Thirteen Treasures of the Island of Britain can be dated to the 16th century, but not much before that (Note: For in the manuscript dated c. 1500 (Θ text, Brit. Mus. Add. 14, 919) it is stated that Taliessin carried off the Thirteen Treasures. apud Bromwich (2014), p. 462) Later notice by Lewis Morris (1701–1765) states that Myrddin had rescued the 13 treasures from Caerleon that was destroyed, and transported them to his House of Glass on Bardsey. (Note: Lewis Morris, apud Bromwich (2014), p. cviii) The tying of the House of Glass to the Bardsey (Ynys Enlli) location goes no further back than 16th century in Bromwich's opinion.

Lewis Morris records the lore Myrddin was buried on the island, (Note: Morris, Celtic Remains, p. 170 also cited by Ford (1976), p. 384, n18.) (Note: John Owen Williams (Pedrog) also records the lore that on the little island of Enlli, Myrddin was buried ("Yn yr ynys hon y claddwyd Merddin Wyllt ap Morfran").) Ranulf Higden (d. 1363/4) also wrote that Merlinus Silvestris was buried on Bardsey. (Note: Polychronicon I, Ch. 39 apud Bromwich (2014), p. 462)

== Geoffrey of Monmouth ==
The modern depiction of Merlin began with Geoffrey of Monmouth, who portrayed Merlin as a prophet and a madman, and introduced him into Arthurian legend. Geoffrey of Monmouth popularised Merlin the wizard, associated with the town of Carmarthen in South Wales. His book Prophetiae Merlini was intended to be a collection of the prophecies of the Welsh figure of Myrddin, whom he called Merlin. He included the Prophetiae in his more famous second work, the Historia Regum Britanniae. In this work, however, he constructed an account of Merlin's life that placed him in the time of Ambrosius Aurelianus and King Arthur, decades before the lifetime of Myrddin Wyllt. He also attached to him an episode originally ascribed to Ambrosius (cf. also Merlinus Ambrosius under § Three Merlins below), and others that appear to be of his own invention.

Geoffrey later wrote the Vita Merlini, an account based more closely on the earlier Welsh stories about Myrddin and his experiences at Arfderydd, and explained that the action was taking place long after Merlin's involvement with Arthur.

Geoffrey's Vita Merlini matches the Welsh "Apple-trees" poem, in some ways as the Vita (v. 90ff.) also mentions apple trees, and the Silva Calidonis in it is clearly the Coed Celydon of this poem. But Merlinus here, though held captive by Rodarch, is King of Demetae (Dyfed) in his own right, and sides with Rodarchus, king of Cumbri (presumably Rhydderch) against Guennolous (Gwenddolau), thus completely switching sides compared with the Welsh version of affairs.

=== Three Merlins ===
Gerald of Wales clearly distinguished Merlinus Ambrosius (Myrddin Emrys) of Carmarthen who prophesied before Vortigern to be separate from Merlinus Celidonius aka Merlinus Sylvester of the North who was a contemporary of Arthur, whereas Geoffrey amalgamated the two figures in his works. (Note: Bromwich (1978), note to "Myrddin Wyllt", p. 472 (pp. 469–474))

On the question of the "Three Merlins", Welsh historian John Edward Lloyd rendered opinion that the third Merlin, i.e. Myrddin Wyllt, was not connected with either, which is true insofar as Geoffrey is concerned, as he incorporated the two Merlinus's but not the wild man version. But contrary to Lloyd, later scholars have identified Merlinus Celidonius/Sylvester with the Welsh Myrddin Wyllt, with the parallels being established the Merlin of Vita and the Myrddin of the poem (the Caledonian forest connection and the apple trees, cf. the Apple-tree poem under § Welsh literature above).

== Elis Gruffydd ==
The massive chronicle compiled by Elis Gruffydd (1490–1552) contains a fair amount of material on Myrddin. A tract on the history of Myrddin describes his conception by Aldan the nun, sired by a spirit called Minckamws, and subsequent baptism as "Merddin" by St. Blaise, which clearly follow French Arthurian sources (Vulgate Merlin).

Myrddin then prophesies before Vortigern (thus borrowing from § Geoffrey of Monmouth). Myrddin also makes a Threefold Death Prophecy (about a knight), but this material again parallels the Vulgate. In the French prose Lestoire de Merlin, Merlin foretells to Pendragon a certain jealous baron's threefold death, that "he will break his neck, and hang, and drown". (Note: "se brisera le col, et pendra et neirera" (§43, ll. 43–49)) Likewise in Gruffydd's chronicle, Myrddin predicts a knight (marchog) will die in the just such manner (Welsh: "yw crogi, torri mwnwgl, boddi") except in a different order ("hanging" first), and tells it to Arthur instead of Pendragon. (Note: And so the knight dies as predicted (Middle Welsh: "J kroged y marchog ac J tores ef J vynwgyl ac J boddes ef"), text, end of fol. 347b in the NLW MS. 5276D, though another difference in Elis's version is that the predictions occur in three separate monasteries (mynachlog, Middle Welsh: vanachlog).)

In a brief tale Ysdori Merddin Wylld ("The Story of Myrddin the Wild"), (Note: Fol. 400b-402a in NLW MS. 5276D.) Merddin who has taken leave of his wits lives in the wild, but because he has been granted the power of prophecy, his sister Gwenddydd brings provisions of bread and butter, and five drinks ("wine in silver, and mead in a horn, and the beer in sycamore, and the milk in a white jug, and the water in an earthen jug.), to restore his sanity, and induce him to prophesize. Thus this tale serves as a prelude to the story that follows, regarding Gwenddydd's five dreams and their interpretations by Myrddin. There is a variant "Tradition in Anglesey" recorded by Lewis Morris (1701–1765) where Gwenddydd offers just two drinks to Myrddin, milk and beer, (Note: Note that British Library Archives and Manuscripts Catalogue "Add MS 14907" gives a list of contents, among which: ."Merddin ab Morvryn, alias Merddin Wylt: Notes concerning" occurs at fol. 142 (to 153), and last item "Kingdom of Scotland: Note of Ce[l]tic words used in Scotland" is at fol. 219.) suggesting a piece of earlier-established Welsh folklore, rather than foreign-derived adaptation.

There follows the "Five Dreams of Gwenddydd" (Note: Jones does not give a Welsh title, but the modern Welsh name has been applied elsewhere as Myrddin a Phum Breuddwyd Gwenddydd for the two sections combined edited by Jones. Jones's second section is given the header "Y Breuddwydd Kyntla" or "The First Dream", which is more of an incipit than a title.) "The dreams consist of vague vaticinations". Although Gruffydd's version dates to around the mid-16th century, he must have transcribed from an earlier source, though difficult to date for lack of internal evidence, but the prophecies do bear resemblance to those from the 14th century Middle English Piers Plowman.

== Scottish literature ==
The aforementioned Lailoken appears in the Vita Sancti Kentigerni by Jocelyn of Furness (c. 1180 (Note: Or end of 12th century.)) where Lailoken meets St. Kentigern (Saint Mungo) and notably predicts his own threefold death (by cudgeling, piercing, and drowning). There is also a 15th century version of it in the MS. Cotton Titus A XIX, dubbed Vita Merlini Silvestris, of which Section I is also called "Lailoken and Kentigern" or Lailoken A, and it asserts that Lailoken was also known as Merlin (dicunt fuisse Merlynum).

Vita Merlini Silvestris Section II (aka "Lailoken and Meldred" or Lailoken B,) comprising a prequel going several years back recounts how Lailoken was imprisoned by petty king Meldred (of Drumelzier) interested in his prophecies. After irking the king with vague hints he knew a secret kept by the queen, Lailoken bargained for his freedom and a promise for proper burial near the River Tweed, in exchange for elaborating that he knew the queen had been committing adultery in the bushes, on evidence of the leaf in her hat.

The grave site is at Drumelzier near Peebles, although nothing remains above ground level today at the landmark.

Walter Bower's 15th century Scotichronicon (Bk.3,Ch.31) delivers a cruder rendition of the legend, and this too asserts that Laloicen was Myrddin Wyllt.

== Cornish literature ==
The tradition was apparently shared with Cornish literature, however only a single Latin translation of a lost Cornish-language original Prophecy of Merlin exists in the Vatican library by John of Cornwall.

== Onomastics ==
Legend has it that second part of Carmarthen's name (in Welsh -fyrddin) was derived from Myrddin and identified his place of birth, but Celticist A. O. H. Jarman noted that not much importance should be attached to this. For during the time Britannia was a Roman province, Carmarthen was the civitas capital of the Demetae tribe, known as Moridunum (from Brittonic *mori-dunon meaning "sea fort"), and this is the true source of the town's name. Conversely, the name Myrddin may have been derived from Carmarthen. (Note: Jarman himself credits d'Arbois de Jubainville (1868) and Egerton Phillimore (1890), even though Frykenberg makes it out to be Jarman's theory.)

Clas Myrddin, or Merlin's Enclosure, is an early name for Great Britain stated in the Third Series of Welsh Triads.
