= Gwenddydd =

Character from Welsh legend

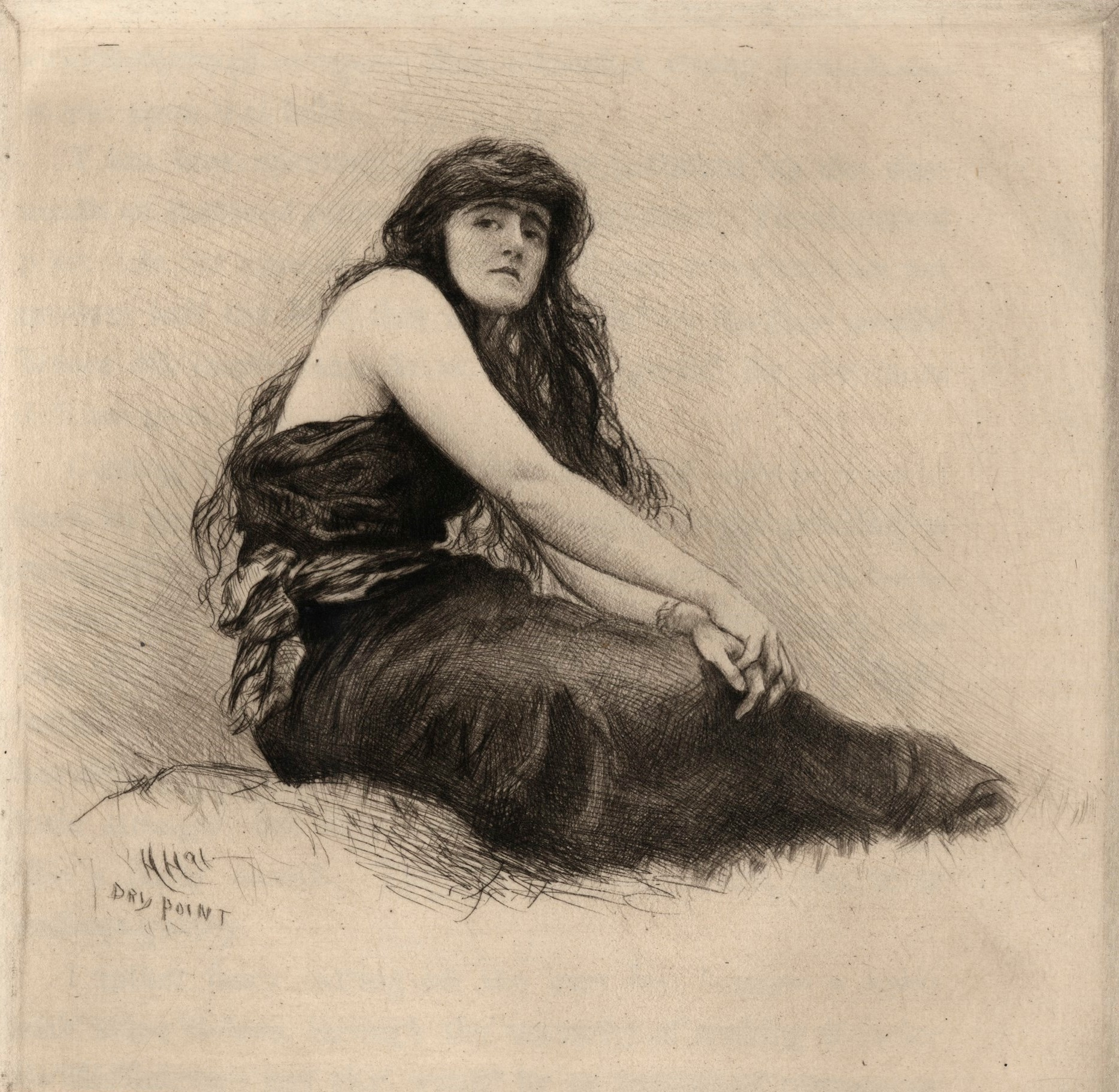
Gwenddydd (1891), a drypoint engraving by Sir Hubert von Herkomer

Gwenddydd, also known as Gwendydd and Ganieda, is a character from Welsh legend. She first appears in the early Welsh poems like the Dialogue of Myrddin and Gwenddydd and in the 12th-century Latin Vita Merlini by Geoffrey of Monmouth, where she is represented as being a figure in the Old North of Britain, the sister of Myrddin or Merlin, and a prophet in her own right. Geoffrey also makes her the wife of the northern king Rhydderch Hael. She was remembered in Welsh traditions recorded in the 16th century by Elis Gruffydd, and even as late as the 18th century. Since the late 19th century she has occasionally appeared as Merlin's sister or lover in Arthurian fiction, poetry and drama by writers such as Laurence Binyon, John Cowper Powys, John Arden, Margaretta D'Arcy and Stephen R. Lawhead.

== Early Welsh verse ==
Gwenddydd first appears in literature as a character in those early Welsh poems that became associated with the poet and warrior Myrddin Wyllt, and in Geoffrey of Monmouth's Latin verse Vita Merlini. The relationship between these poems is contested.

The poems Afallennau ("The Apple-trees") and Oianau or Hoianau ("The Greetings") both give us the prophecies of a wild man somewhere in the Old North (southern Scotland and northern England); he is not identified in either poem, but later generations were agreed in identifying him, correctly or not, with Myrddin. Gwenddydd is not said to be the wild man's sister in Afallennau, and indeed it has been argued that in the original form of the legend she was Myrddin's fairy lover; however she is twice mentioned in the poem, the poet complaining that

Now Gwenddydd loves me not, and does not greet me;
I have killed her son and her daughter.

Similarly, Oianau refers to her in the phrase "Gwenddydd does not come to me".

Cyfoesi Myrddin a Gwenddydd ei Chwaer ("The Conversation of Myrddin and His Sister Gwenddydd") establishes their family relationship, and is unique among the Welsh Myrddin poems in showing Gwenddydd and her brother on friendly terms. Myrddin prophesies political events culminating in his own death and the end of the world, while Gwenddydd, herself a seer in this poem, questions him in a respectful manner and shows herself concerned about Myrddin's welfare. The poem ends with them commending each other to heaven.

Gwasgargedd Fyrddin yn y Bedd ("The Diffused Song of Myrddin in the Grave"), another vaticinatory poem, has been seen as a sequel to Cyfoesi. In a passage of reminiscence Myrddin makes one obscure reference to Gwenddydd:

Gwasawg, I was told your cry to Gwenddydd
by the mountain madmen in Aber Craf.

Finally, Peirian Faban ("Commanding Youth") contains more prophecies and mentions both Myrddin and Gwenddydd. Gwenddydd predicts that

Myrddin will come, with great purpose,
because of the killing of my brothers and Gwenddolau.

== Vita Merlini ==
The Vita Merlini is a Latin poem by Geoffrey of Monmouth, written probably in 1150 or 1151, describing events in the life of Myrddin, or as Geoffrey calls him, Merlinus. The poem begins with Merlinus going mad after a horrendous battle, and running off to live as a wild man in the Caledonian Forest. His sister Ganieda and her husband Rodarchus, king of the Cumbrians, discover his whereabouts and bring him back to their court, where he has to be chained to prevent him returning to the woods.

When Merlinus sees a leaf in Ganieda's hair he laughs, but refuses to explain his laughter unless he is freed. When this is done he tells Rodarchus that the leaf got into Ganieda's hair when she lay outdoors with her lover. Ganieda then seeks to discredit Merlinus by a trick. She produces a boy on three different occasions, dressed in different costume every time to disguise his identity, and asks her brother each time how he will die. The first time Merlinus says he will die in a fall from a rock, the second time that he will die in a tree, and the third time that he will die in a river. Rodarchus is thus persuaded that Merlinus can be fooled, and that his judgement is not to be trusted. The author now explains that in later years the boy fell from a rock, was caught in the branches of a tree beneath it, and being entangled there upside down with his head in a river he drowned.

Merlinus returns to the woods, but after various adventures he is captured and taken back to Rodarchus's court. There he sees first a beggar and then a young man buying leather to patch his shoes, and he laughs at each of them. Rodarchus again offers Merlinus his freedom if he will explain why he laughed, and Merlinus answers that the beggar was unknowingly standing over buried treasure and that the young man's fate was to drown before he could wear his repaired shoes. When Merlinus' words are confirmed Rodarchus lets him go.

Back in the woods Merlinus watches the stars in an observatory Ganieda has made for him, and prophesies the future history of Britain as far as the Norman kings. Rodarchus dies and Ganieda grieves for him. She and Rodarchus' visitor Telgesinus go to the woods to see Merlinus, and they discourse on various subjects. It is resolved that they will all remain together in the woods, in retirement from the secular world. The poem ends with a prophecy from Ganieda detailing events in the reign of King Stephen, and a renunciation by Merlinus of his own prophetic gift in her favour.

Ganieda is, according to the Vita's editor Basil Clarke, the best-realised character in the poem apart from Merlinus himself, being shown as intelligent, practical, resourceful and, unusually for a female character in medieval literature, prophetic. Her name and much of her story demonstrate her identity with the Gwenddydd of the Myrddin poems, but her position as wife of Rodarchus and as the adulteress with the leaf in her hair both have analogues in the character of Languoreth in the early Welsh story of Lailoken. It has also been suggested that Geoffrey's Ganieda may in part be inspired by the example of his contemporary Christina of Markyate, a well-born Anglo-Saxon lady who escaped an arranged marriage to become a hermit and clairvoyant.

== Later Welsh tradition ==
The Chronicle of the Six Ages, by the early 15th-century soldier Elis Gruffydd, includes a collection of traditional stories about Myrddin. In one section we learn that Myrddin ran mad in the wilds of Nant Conwy in North Wales, that he prophesied, and that his sister Gwenddydd supplied him with food and drink. Gwenddydd has five dreams at various times, and eventually she comes to Myrddin and asks him to explain them, which he does in a vein of social criticism that calls to mind William Langland's Piers Plowman. A somewhat expanded version of the account of the five dreams also occurs in a late 17th-century manuscript written by Thomas ab Ieuan of Tre'r Bryn. Both seem to derive from an orally transmitted version which cannot be dated, though it seems to be quite independent of the Vita Merlini.

A manuscript dated to c.1640, now among the British Library Additional manuscripts at Add MS 14973, includes a prose Prophetic Mabinogi of Merddin and Gwenddydd.

In the 18th century the poet Lewis Morris recorded an Anglesey folk-tale in which a young man, the young woman he loves, a middle-aged woman and a widow are in contention as to which of them the man should marry, and consult Myrddin and his sister Gwenddydd to resolve the issue. There are points of similarity which suggest some relationship with Elis Gruffydd's account of Myrddin's madness.

== Modern literature ==
In 1870 the Scottish Arthurian scholar John Stuart-Glennie published The Quest for Merlin, the first in a projected but uncompleted cycle of five dramas collectively entitled King Arthur; or, The Drama of the Revolution. Set during the reign of Vortigern, it promotes the author's creed of "Nature-worship of Heathenism and the Fraternal Sentiment of Christianity", which is to be embodied in Merlin. One of its characters is Ganieda, who tells her brother that

all the people, Merlin, are seeking thee
the bond of their new brotherhood to be.

Merlin (1889), is a verse play by Professor John Veitch, with only three characters: Merlin, "Gwendydd (The Dawn) - His twin sister", and "Hwimleian (The Gleam) - His early love". Gwendydd is in Veitch's words "redolent of the nature-worship and the poetry of the time"; she redeems her brother from madness. It was one of the sources of Tennyson's poem Merlin and the Gleam.

The first part of an unfinished work by Laurence Binyon, The Madness of Merlin, was posthumously published in 1947 in an edition by Gordon Bottomley. In this verse play, based largely on the Vita Merlini, Geoffrey's Ganieda is split into two characters, Merlin's sister Gwyndyth and Redderch's queen Langoreth. Their attitudes to Merlin in his madness are contrasted: Gwyndyth patient and comforting, Langoreth exasperated with how well he is being treated.

The writer John Cowper Powys used the Gwenddydd of the Welsh poem Cyfoesi Myrddin a Gwenddydd as the basis of his Gwendydd, sister of Myrddin, in his Porius (1951), a historical novel set in the year 499. She has been described as "one of the most memorable minor characters".

The Island of the Mighty is an epic drama in three parts by John Arden and Margaretta D'Arcy, first performed, in a truncated form, in December 1972 by the Royal Shakespeare Company at the Aldwych Theatre, London. Gwenddydd, played in the RSC production by Heather Canning, is not in this play Merlin's sister but his estranged wife.

Merlin (1988), the second novel in Stephen R. Lawhead's Pendragon Cycle, introduces the character of Ganieda in one episode as the title-character's lover rather than his sister.

In the 1995 novelette Namer of Beasts, Maker of Souls, by Jessica Amanda Salmonson, Merlin has a twin-sister called Ganicenda, described as "Divine Wisdom, with her head in heaven and her feet in Sheol".

The American academic Jerry Hunter's Welsh-language novel Gwenddydd [cy] (2010) takes the story of Gwenddydd and Myrddin from the earliest Welsh poems and the Vita Merlini, and transposes it to the Second World War, Myrddin becoming a soldier suffering from PTSD who escapes from a military hospital and reunites with his sister Gwen in the family's home village. It won the Prose Medal at the 2010 National Eisteddfod of Wales, and has been called "an important contribution to war literature in Wales".

== Works of art ==
In 1891 the German-born, British-naturalized artist Hubert Herkomer, a Royal Academician, produced a drypoint engraving of Gwenddydd. His interest in the subject was confirmed in 1893 when he chose the same name for his lastborn daughter.

The Breton sculptor Louis-Henri Nicot's bas-relief Taliésin et Ganiéda (1925) forms part of the Monument néoceltique produced for the International Exhibition of Modern Decorative and Industrial Arts in Paris.
