= Lailoken =

6th-century legendary fool from Scotland

Lailoken (aka Merlyn Sylvester) was a semi-legendary madman and prophet who lived in the Caledonian Forest in the late 6th century. The Life of Saint Kentigern mentions "a certain foolish man, who was called Laleocen" living at or near the village of Peartnach (Partick) within the Kingdom of Strathclyde. Laleocen correctly prophesied the death of King Rhydderch Hael.

As a wild man and seer living in the forests of what is now southern Scotland, Lailoken is often identified with Myrddin Wyllt, the Welsh forerunner of the Arthurian wizard Merlin. Myrddin is particularly associated with the Battle of Arfderydd in Cumberland (now Cumbria) and the area just to the north, over the border in modern Scotland; Myrddin fought for the losing side and, after the battle, went insane.

In the late 15th-century short tract preserved in MS. Cotton Titus A xix, fol. 74–75, dubbed Vita Merlini Silvestris ("Life of Merlin of the Forest") Section 1, also called "Lailoken and Kentigern" or Lailoken A, the events with the saint are described as follows: St. Kentigern meets a naked, hairy madman called Lailoken, said by some to be called Merlynum or Merlin, in a deserted place. He has been condemned for his sins to wander in the company of beasts, having been the cause of the deaths of all of the persons killed in the battle "fought on the plain that lies between Liddel and Carwannok (Carwinley Beck)". Having told his story, the madman leaps up and flees from the presence of the saint back into the wilderness. He appears several times more in the narrative until at last asking St. Kentigern for the Sacrament, prophesying that he was about to die a triple death. After some hesitation, the saint grants the madman's wish, harboring no doubt that the man will die as prophesied.

The sequel in Section 2, also called "Lailoken and Meldred" or Lailoken B, goes back several years in time before the meeting with St. Kentigern, when Lailoken was captured by the underking Meldred of Drumelzier who hoped to elicit prophecies of some use to him. After Meldred's queen appears and a leaf falls from her headdress, Lailoken laughs, but when Meldred demands an explanation, will only answer in riddles incomprehensible to the underking. Finally Lailoken bargains for his freedom and eventual proper burial (on a plot near the confluence of River Tweed and Pausayl) after his death in exchange for a straight answer, and reveals the queen had been engaged in adultery in the garden, and the leaf was the evidence, which Meldred impetuously had torn up. Meldred honors the bargain, though the embarrassed queen tries to persuade her husband it was falsehood and that Lailoken should be pursued for the calumny. Years go by, and the queen incites a band of shepherds, who beat him with clubs (Section I explained that after the beating, Lailoken tumbled down the steep side of the River Tweed, then was impaled by a stake which was part of a fish trap, then drowned), thus fulfilling his prophecy. The body, while still alive, was turned over by the king to the burial place.

Lailoken may be a form of the name Llallogan, which occurs in the Welsh poem Cyfoesi Myrddin a Gwenddydd ei Chwaer (or "The Conversation of Merlin and his Sister Gwenddydd"), where Gwenddydd refers to Merlin as Llallawg and its diminutive, Llallwgan. The name is comparable to Modern Welsh *llallog “brother, friend, lord (as a form of address); honour, dignity”, also "a twin; twin(-like)".

== See also ==
- Myrddin Wyllt
- Suibhne Geilt – parallel figure in Irish legend
