= Clas Myrddin =

Early name for Great Britain given in the Third Series of Welsh Triads

Clas Myrddin, or Merlin's Enclosure, is an early name for Great Britain given in the Third Series of Welsh Triads. It is implied that it is the oldest name, as opposed to "Albion", but the implication is not wholly credible.
