= Peredur =

Male name from historical sub-Roman Britain

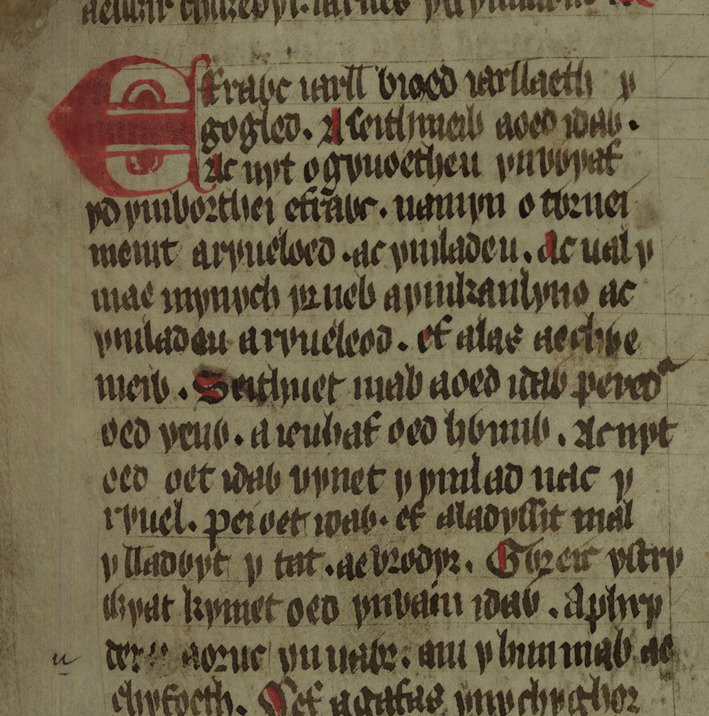
Opening lines of the 14th c.Peredur son of Efrawg manuscript from the Red Book of Hergest

Peredur (Welsh pronunciation: [pɛˈrɛdɨr], Old Welsh Peretur) is the name of a number of men from the boundaries of history and legend in sub-Roman Britain. The Peredur who is most familiar to a modern audience is the character who made his entrance as a knight in the Arthurian world of Middle Welsh prose literature.

== Gwrgi and Peredur, sons of Eliffer ==
Gwrgi and Peredur are listed as sons of Eliffer (Old Welsh: Elidir or Eleuther) "of the great warband" (cascord maur) and as sons of the Coeling dynasty in the Harleian genealogies, making them first cousins of Urien. Likewise, a pedigree from Jesus College MS 20 includes Gwrgi and Peredur as brothers together with one Arthur penuchel. Their principal claim to fame rests on their having fought in the Battle of Arfderydd. The Annales Cambriae report that this battle (bellum Armterid) was fought in 573, but gives no further detail. A later expansion of the entry names Gwrgi and Peredur, both described as sons of Eliffer, as the chieftains on the victorious side and tells that Gwenddoleu ap Ceidio was defeated and slain in the battle. Under the year 580, the Annales Cambriae record the deaths of Gwrgi (Guurci) and his brother Peredur (Peretur). These references give them a place as heroes in the Hen Ogledd of the late 6th century.

Further detail is supplied in later legendary traditions, notably those represented by the Welsh Triads (Trioedd Ynys Prydein). One listing the three "Horse-Burdens" of Britain relates that Gwrgi, Peredur, Dynod Bwr and Cynfelyn Drwsgl were carried by a horse called Corvan, which enabled them to watch the clouds of dust ("battle-fog") coming from Gwenddoleu and his (mounted) forces in the battle of Arfderydd. The circumstances in which Gwrgi and Peredur died are alluded to in a Triad which explains that they had one of "Three Faithless Warbands of the Island of Britain". Their warband abandoned them at Caer Greu on the day before a battle with Eda Glinmaur ("Great-Knee") and so they were slain. The Welsh Triads also refer to family relations. One on the "Three Fair Womb-Burdens" of Britain, preserved incompletely in Peniarth MS 47, suggests that Peredur and Gwrgi had a sister called Arddun, while a variant version in Peniarth MS 50 calls the third sibling Ceindrech Pen Asgell ("Wing-head") and names the mother Efrddyl verch Gynfarch. Peredur is said to have had a son by the name of Gwgon Gwron, called one of the three "Prostrate Chieftains" (Lledyf Vnben) because "they would not seek a dominion, which nobody could deny to them".

Still further allusions are found in early Welsh poetry. The poem Ymddiddan Myrddin a Thaliesin, which assumes the form of a dialogue between Myrddin Wyllt (the prototype of Merlin) and the poet Taliesin, deals out praise to the brave "sons of Eliffer", saying that they did not avoid spears in the heat of battle. The apparent context is the battle of Arfderydd, where Myrddin fought as one of Gwenddoleu's warriors, went mad from terror and in this way, acquired the gift of prophecy (see also Vita Merlini below). For some unknown reason, however, the poem extends the number of sons to seven. A warrior called Peredur is also listed in one of the younger sections of Y Gododdin (awdl A.31), which shows him as one of the heroes to have died fighting in battle as a member of the warband of Mynyddog Mwynfawr, chieftain of the Gododdin in "the Old North". It has been argued that Peredur's appearance here may have been due to a tendency in the growth of the poem to draw personages known from such sources as the Annales Cambriae into the orbit of its subject matter, assuming he is the same Peredur.

== Geoffrey of Monmouth's Peredurus ==
Geoffrey of Monmouth, the author of the Historia Regum Britanniae, mentions a Peredur in his Vita Merlini (The Life of Merlin), an account of Merlin drawing heavily on narrative traditions about Myrddin Wyllt. In an early episode based clearly on the story of the Battle of Arfderydd, Peredur (Peredurus) is joined by his allies Merlin, king of the South Welsh, and Rhydderch Hael, king of the Cumbrians, when he engages Gwenddoleu (Guennolus), king of Scotland, in a battle at an unnamed site. Merlin loses three brothers and driven mad from grief, takes refuge in the woods. Peredur is here presented as prince of the North Welsh (dux Venedotorum) rather than a ruler in the British North.

In his earlier and more famous work, Historia regum Britanniae, Geoffrey of Monmouth also used the name Peredurus for a legendary ruler of Britain who was the fifth and youngest son born to the legendary Morvidus, king of the Britons. He is said to have conspired with his brother Ingenius to capture and oust their brother Elidurus, locking him up in Trinovantum. When the brothers divided the kingdom between them, Peredur became ruler over the part north of the Humber, including 'Albany' (Scotland), and following Elidurus' death, succeeded to the entire kingdom. In the same work, Geoffrey also includes one Peredur map Peridur among the leading magnates of the realm who attended King Arthur's plenary Court in the City of the Legion.

== Peredur son of Efrawg (Middle Welsh Arthurian romance) ==
A Peredur is also the hero of the Welsh romance Peredur son of Efrawg, where he claims the role performed by the Arthurian knight Percival in the works of Chrétien de Troyes and other non-Welsh sources.

== Other ==
In the Englynion y Beddau, another Peredur, called Peredur of Penweddig (a cantref of Ceredigion), occurs as the father of the legendary hero Môr.

In the syndicated U.S. comic strip Prince Valiant, Sir Peredur The Rover is a notorious mercenary knight who is hired to fight Gawain in a contest of champions in a March 2021 story line.

Peredur appears as a mythic archetype in Robert Holdstock's novel Mythago Wood.
