= Longtown, Cumbria =

Town in Cumbria, England

Coordinates: 55.0084°N 2.9687°W

Longtown
- Town
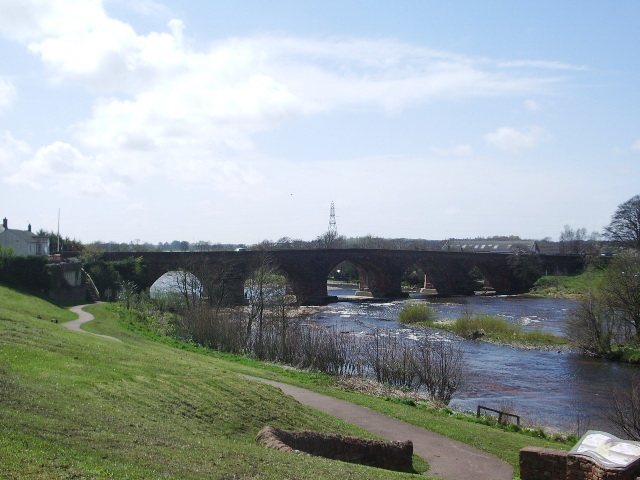
- Longtown, bridge over the River Esk

- Location within Cumbria
- OS grid reference: NY380686
- Civil parish: Arthuret
- Unitary authority: Cumberland
- Ceremonial county: Cumbria
- Region: North West
- Country: England
- Sovereign state: United Kingdom
- Post town: Carlisle
- Postcode district: CA6
- Dialling code: 01228
- Police: Cumbria
- Fire: Cumbria
- Ambulance: North West
- UK Parliament: Carlisle

Longtown is a market town in the Cumberland district of Cumbria, England. It is in the parish of Arthuret and on the River Esk, 11 3/4 miles (19 kilometres) north of Carlisle and just south of the Scottish Border. It has a sheep market which was at the centre of the 2001 United Kingdom foot-and-mouth crisis. Just south-west of Longtown is Arthuret Church, dedicated to Saint Michael and All Angels.

== History ==
Historically in Cumberland, nearby was the Battle of Arfderydd in 573. The Battle of Solway Moss was fought nearby in 1542.

There was an earthquake measuring 4.7 on the Magnitude Scale, the epicentre was in Longtown. The earthquake was felt in Longtown, Carlisle, Gretna, Dumfries and slight moderate damage in Canonbie.

The population of the town in the 1841 census was 1,990 inhabitants.

Longtown is the location of the largest sheep markets in England. The first animal to be found infected with foot-and-mouth disease in the 2001 crisis had been purchased at Longtown Market. While at the market it spread the infection to other animals. The size of the Longtown Sheep Market meant that the disease had spread right across the country in a very short time. Longtown became the centre for control of the disease in south western Scotland and North West England.

== Governance ==
Longtown is in the parliamentary constituency of Carlisle.

For local government purposes, it is administered as part of the Cumberland unitary authority. Historically, it was in the Eskdale wapentake of the county of Cumberland. From 1894 to 1934 it was in Longtown Rural District, and from 1934 to 1974 it was in Border Rural District. In 1974, Border Rural District was merged into the new City of Carlisle district in the newly created county of Cumbria, and in 2023 the Carlisle district was in turn merged into the Cumberland unitary district.

Longtown is the largest settlement in the civil parish of Arthuret, which has a own parish council.

== Education ==
Longtown has one primary school with around 190 pupils. Most secondary school pupils travel to William Howard School, Brampton, or Carlisle. Though up until 2008 Longtown had its own secondary school, Lochinvar School.

== Media ==
Local news and television programmes are provided by BBC North East and Cumbria and ITV Border. Television signals are received from the Caldbeck TV transmitter. Local radio stations are BBC Radio Cumbria on 95.6 FM, BBC Radio Scotland can also be heard on 94.7 FM and Greatest Hits Radio Cumbria & South West Scotland on 96.4 FM. The town is served by the local newspaper, News and Star.

== Environment ==
In April 2014 Carlisle City Council rejected a planning application for a 2-million-imperial-gallon (9-million-litre) slurry lagoon at Scaurbank Wood, to the north east of Longtown. The planned slurry lagoon was said to be the most objected to plan in the city council's history, with more than 1,400 letters or e-mails of objection.

== Industry ==
=== Coal mining ===
Lochinvar coalfield was discovered in the 1950s by the National Coal Board and was subject to drilling but never mined. From 2014 an Australian firm was exploring the coalfield for coking coal to produce steel. The company was exploring as far north as Evertown near Canonbie, and as far south as Longtown.

=== DMC Longtown ===
During the 1930s, there was a recognition of a need to provide secure storage for munitions across the United Kingdom. The proposal was to create three Central Ammunition Depots (CAD): one in the south (Monkton Farleigh in Wiltshire); one in the Midlands (Nesscliffe in Shropshire); and one in the north.

While the other two sites were sat above easily hewn limestone, Longtown is located above granite, which meant that it took longer to create and only came into operations late in the Second World War. The site was chosen as it used to be part of HM Factory, Gretna, that stretched to Eastriggs over the border in Scotland, one of the biggest makers of explosives during the First World War. The township of Gretna was established to house the workers of this establishment.

Today, DMC (Defence Munitions Centre) Longtown is the only one of the three CADs to remain in operation and is among the largest defence munitions sites in Western Europe. Currently, Longtown and Eastriggs are two separate sites under joint management. In November 2013 the Ministry of Defence announced that the operational capacity of MoD Longtown would be reduced and a small area of the site would be given over to commercial use.

== See also ==
- Listed buildings in Arthuret
