= Gwenddoleu ap Ceidio =

- King of Arfderydd
- Reign: ??? – c. 573
- Predecessor: Ceidio ap Arthwys
- Died: c. 573; Arfderydd
- Father: Ceidio ap Arthwys

Gwenddoleu ap Ceidio (died c. 573) or Gwenddolau was a Brythonic king who ruled in Arfderydd (now Arthuret). This is in what is now south-west Scotland and north-west England in the area around Hadrian's Wall and Carlisle during the sub-Roman period in Britain. Carwinley, near Longtown, north of Carlisle, possibly derives from Cumbric Caer Wenddolau or Gwenddolau's Fort. The earthworks at Liddel Strength is also another contender for Caer Wenddolau.

== Men of the North ==
Bonedd Gwŷr y Gogledd records Gwenddoleu as one of the Men of the North and thus the genealogies claim that the legendary figure of Coel Hen is Gwenddoleu's great-great-great-grandfather. Coel Hen was a semi-historical figure and legend often attributes much of southern Scotland to his kingdom. These genealogies also record the names of his two brothers, Nudd and Chof.

== Early life ==
Gwenddoleu's father was Ceidio ap Arthwys and he had two brothers, Nudd and Chof. Little is known of Chof (sometimes spelt Cof); however, parallels are often drawn between Nudd and the legendary figure of Lludd Llaw Eraint, father of Gwyn ap Nudd.

Ceidio's brother, Eliffer Gosgorddfawr was presumed to have been a king of Ebrauc, believed to be the old Roman stronghold of Eburacum. Eliffer had two sons called Gwrgi and Peredur (however, it may have been as many as twelve).

It is unknown when Arfderydd was founded or whether it was founded by Gwenddoleu, his father or another person all-together.

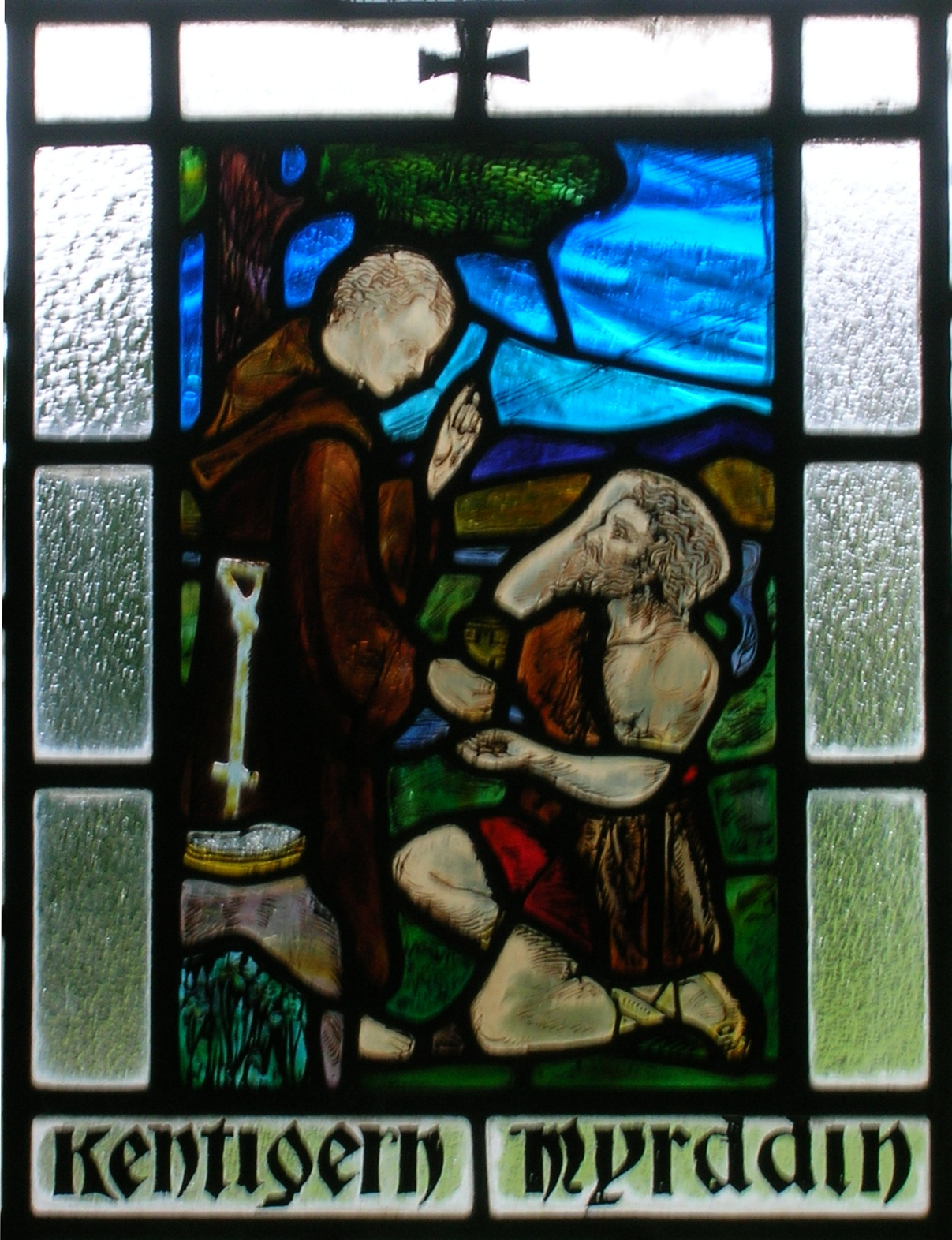
Merlin (Myrddin) being converted to Christianity by Saint Kentigern (Mungo) at Stobo Kirk, Borders, Scotland

== Reign ==
Little is known of his reign, but it ended when, as described in the Annales Cambriae, the sons of Eliffer, Peredur and Gwrgi, the joint kings of Efrog, killed him at the Battle of Arfderydd in 573. It is possible he was succeeded by one of his brothers. This was one of many battles fought between Brythonic kings who led the various fractured successor states that took over the Roman province of Britannia following the Roman withdrawal.

In Welsh mythology, he is the owner of one of the Thirteen Treasures of the Island of Britain: a magical chessboard / gwyddbwyll board. If the pieces were set, they would play by themselves. The board was of gold, and the men of silver.

Although Gwenddoleu plays no part in Arthurian legend, his court adviser Myrddin formed part of the basis for the later Arthurian legends concerning the wizard Merlin. In Geoffrey of Monmouth's Vita Merlini, Myrddin (Merlinus) is said to have been driven mad with grief following the death of Gwenddoleu and to have fled into the Caledonian forest. The memory of both Gwenddoleu and Myrddin was preserved in Welsh literature.
