= Llawfrodedd Farfog =

Llawfrodedd Farfog or Llawfrodedd Farchog (Middle Welsh) is a hero of Welsh tradition. The meaning of the personal name Llawfrodedd is uncertain, however, it is suggested that the name is associated with Llawfrydedd 'Sorrow', the epithets Farfog (barfog) and Farchog (marchog) mean "bearded" and "horseman" respectively.

Llawfrodedd is a hero of Arthur's court in the tales of Culhwch and Olwen and Breuddwyd Rhonabwy. Several examples of the word 'Llawfrodedd' are found in the work of the medieval Gogynfeirdd poets, but it is not clear if it occurs as a proper name.

The evidence suggests that Llawfrodedd may have been one of 'Men of the North', but this can not be proven.

In the Medieval manuscript Bonedd y Saint (The Pedigree of the Saints), the saint Idloes is identified as the son of Gwdnabi and grandson of Llawvrodedd Varfog.
