= Battle of Arfderydd =

6th-century battle in Britain

Coordinates: 55°01′N 02°55′W

Date	573
Location	Arfderydd
Result	Rhydderch Hael's victory, death of Gwenddoleu

Belligerents
Kingdom of Strathclyde; Kingdom of Ebrauc (York)	Arfderydd

Commanders and leaders
Rhydderch Hael; Peredur ab Eliffer; Gwrgi ab Eliffer	Gwenddoleu ap Ceidio †

Strength
Unknown	Unknown

Casualties and losses
Unknown	Unknown

The Battle of Arfderydd (also known as Arderydd) was fought in medieval Britain in AD 573, according to the Annales Cambriae. The opposing armies are identified in a number of Old Welsh sources but vary between them, perhaps suggesting several allied armies were involved. The main adversaries appear to have been Gwenddoleu ap Ceidio and either the princely brothers Peredur and Gwrgi or King Rhydderch Hael of Strathclyde. Gwenddoleu was defeated and killed in the battle. His bard, Myrddin Wyllt, reportedly went mad and ran into the forest. He is one of several proposed origins for the Arthurian character Merlin. The Welsh Triads refer to this battle as one of the "Three Futile Battles of the Island of Britain", along with the Battle of Camlann and the Battle of the Trees.

The 14th-century chronicler John of Fordun's Chronica Gentis Scotorum places the battle on the plain between Liddel and Carwannok. This was identified by W. F. Skene as being at Arthuret, near Longtown, Cumberland (now Cumbria), in North West England.

== In Welsh literature and mythology ==
The battle of Arfderydd is mentioned numerous times in a number of medieval Welsh texts, including the Welsh Triads (Trioedd Ynys Prydein) and the Red Book of Hergest (Llyfr Coch Hergest). The Welsh Triads name Gwenddoleu's warband as one of the "Three Faithful Warbands of the Island of Britain", going on to say that they "continued to battle for a fortnight and a month after their lord was slain." The retinue of Dreon the Brave "at the Dyke of Arfderydd" is named as one of the "Three Noble Retinues", while a listing of the three "Horse-Burdens" of Britain relates that Gwrgi, Peredur, Dunawd the Stout and Cynfelyn Drwsgl were carried by a horse called Corvan, which enabled them to watch the clouds of dust ("battle-fog") coming from Gwenddolau and his (mounted) forces in the battle of Arfderydd.

The Dialogue of Myrddin and Taliesin, the first song of the Black Book of Carmarthen (Llyfr Du Caerfyrddin), refers frequently to the battle, and many warriors said to have fought in the conflict are named: Cedfyl, Cadfan, Maelgwn, Erith, Gwrith, Bran, Melgan, Rhys, Cynelyn, Cyndur, the sons of Eliffer Eliffer Gosgorddfawr, and Dywel fab Erbin. A further poem Apple Trees states that Myrddin wore a golden torque at the battle before fleeing into the Caledonian Forest, while the poem The Dialogue of Gwyn ap Nudd and Gwyddno Garanhir states that Gwyn ap Nudd, a mythological psychopomp, was "at the place where was killed Gwendoleu, the son of Ceidaw, the pillar of songs, where the ravens screamed over blood."
