= Rhydderch Hael =

Ruler of Alt Clut

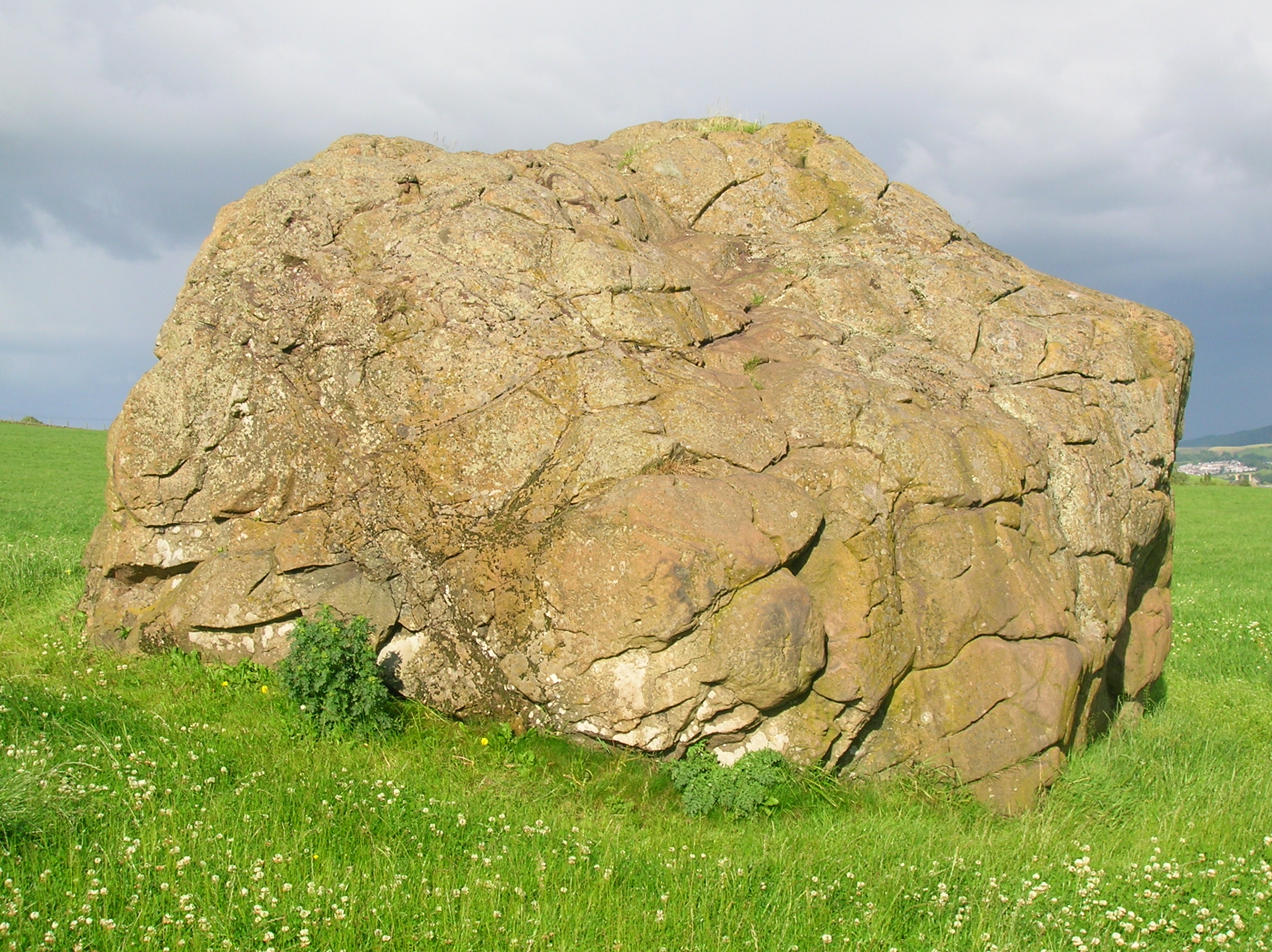
Clochoderick rocking stone in Renfrewshire, Scotland. This stone is said to mark the burial place of Rhydderch.

Rhydderch Hael (English: Rhydderch the Generous), Riderch I of Alt Clut, or Rhydderch of Strathclyde, or Redrath (fl. 580 – c. 614) was a ruler of Alt Clut, a Brittonic kingdom in the Hen Ogledd or "Old North" of Britain. He was one of the most famous kings in the Hen Ogledd, and appears frequently in later medieval works in Welsh and Latin.

== Historical / Semi-historical references ==
Rhydderch appears in Adomnán's Vita Sancti Columbae, written around 700 AD, where he sends a secret message to the saint asking him to prophesy the method of his death. The king is concerned if he should die by the hand of one of his enemies, but the saint tells him that he will die at home in his bed. The description of his death is assumed to be accurate, as Adomnán was writing at a time when Rhydderch's life was probably still relatively well known, and he would be unlikely to attribute a false prophecy to St Columba.

In the 9th century Historia Brittonum, Rhydderch is one of four Brythonic kings (along with Urien, Gwallog and Morcant) named as fighting against Hussa of Bernicia. This is often interpreted as an alliance of Northern Brythonic kings, though it is not explicitly stated that they fought together against Hussa. If they did fight together, Rhydderch may have been present at the siege of Ynys Metcaut (the Island of Lindisfarne), where Urien was assassinated by Morcant.

Rhydderch was possibly the leader of the victorious army at the Battle of Arfderydd (dated 573 by the Annals Cambriae). The earliest (12th century copy of presumed 10th century original) manuscript of the AC dates the battle, but does not give the combatants. John Veitch describes him as the Prince of Lanark.

The 13th century Black Book of Chirk contains a story about a military expedition by Clydno Eidyn and the Tri Hael (Rhydderch, Nudd Hael and Mordaf Hael), where they travel to Gwynedd to avenge the death of Elidir Mwynfawr. Elidir had apparently been killed in a dispute with Rhun Hir over the succession of the kingdom following the death of the previous king Maelgwn Gwynedd. The historical validity of this story is doubted.

== Legendary material ==
Life of St Kentigern

In the Life of Saint Kentigern, Rhydderch is the royal patron of the saint, and through this tied to the founding of the city of Glasgow. One of the saint's miracles was to save Rhydderch's adulterous Queen Languoreth from the king's wrath, by rediscovering her lost ring and thereby proving her innocence. The coat of arms of Glasgow features a salmon with a ring in its mouth in reference to this story.

Welsh mythology

Rhydderch appears in several of the Welsh Triads, along with many characters and events associated with him, indicating a once well known story now lost.

He is the owner of one of the Thirteen Treasures of the Island of Britain: a magical sword called Dyrnwyn (white-hilt). The list also attempts to justify Rhydderch's epithet 'Hael' in describing the sword: "if a well-born man drew it himself, it burst into flame from its hilt to its tip. And everyone who used to ask for it would receive; but because of this peculiarity everyone used to reject it. And therefore he was called Rhydderch the Generous."

Regnal titles
Preceded by Tutagual	King of Alt Clut fl. 580	Succeeded by Neithon
