= Prerogative court =

A prerogative court is a court through which the discretionary powers, privileges, and legal immunities reserved to the sovereign were exercised. In England in the 17th century, a clash developed between these courts, representing the crown's authority, and common law courts. Prerogative courts included the Court of the Exchequer, the Court of Chancery, and the Court of the Star Chamber. Their procedures were flexible and not limited by common law procedures. The Star Chamber became a tool of Charles I employed against his enemies, and was abolished (Habeas Corpus Act 1640) by parliament. A parallel system of common law courts was grounded in Magna Carta and property rights; the main common law courts were the Court of the King's Bench and the Court of Common Pleas.

== Canterbury and York ==
The term also applied to one of the English provincial courts of Canterbury and York having jurisdiction over the estates of deceased persons. They had jurisdiction to grant probate or administration where the diocesan courts could not entertain the case owing to the deceased having died possessed of goods above a set value in each of two or more dioceses. The Prerogative Court of Canterbury (PCC) was a church court under the authority of the Archbishop of Canterbury, which was responsible for the probate of wills and trials of testamentary causes where the value of the goods involved was greater than five pounds, and the property was held in two (or more) dioceses within Great Britain. While wills might also be proven at York, Canterbury's jurisdiction covered Southern England (including London) and Wales. Its archive also contains large numbers of wills relating to individuals who died abroad, but who owned property in Britain. In the period between 1680 and 1820, the Court proved on average 3,700 wills a year, including large numbers of Irish and colonial wills, and those of soldiers and sailors who died while in service. The jurisdiction of the prerogative courts was transferred to the Court of Probate in 1857 by the Court of Probate Act 1857, and is now vested in the Family Division of the High Court of Justice by the Judicature Act.

== Dublin ==
The same term was used to describe the Prerogative Court of the Archbishop of Armagh, latterly established at Henrietta Street, in Dublin, which proved the wills of testators dying with assets of value greater than £5 ("bona notabilia") in at least two Irish dioceses. In practice, the business of the Court was conducted by an experienced civil lawyer: the first recorded judge, appointed in 1575, was Sir Ambrose Forth (died 1610), who was also the first judge of the Irish Court of Admiralty. This court was also abolished by the Court of Probate Act 1857.

== French equivalents ==
In France, more commonly known as cour souveraine (literally "Sovereign court") or cour supérieure from 1661, referred to any prerogative courts of last resort in monarchical France. Among them included the King's Council, the Court of Accounts, the Cour des aides, the Cour des monnaies, and Paris and provincial Parlements.

== Bibliography ==
- Challenor, J. (1895). Index of Wills Proved in the Prerogative Court of Canterbury 1383–1558, vol. 2 (Names: Kalf–Zowche). London.
- Furnivall, Frederick J. (1882). The Fifty Earliest English Wills in the Court of Probate 1387–1439. London.
