= Merlin =

Legendary Welsh wizard

- Matter of Britain character
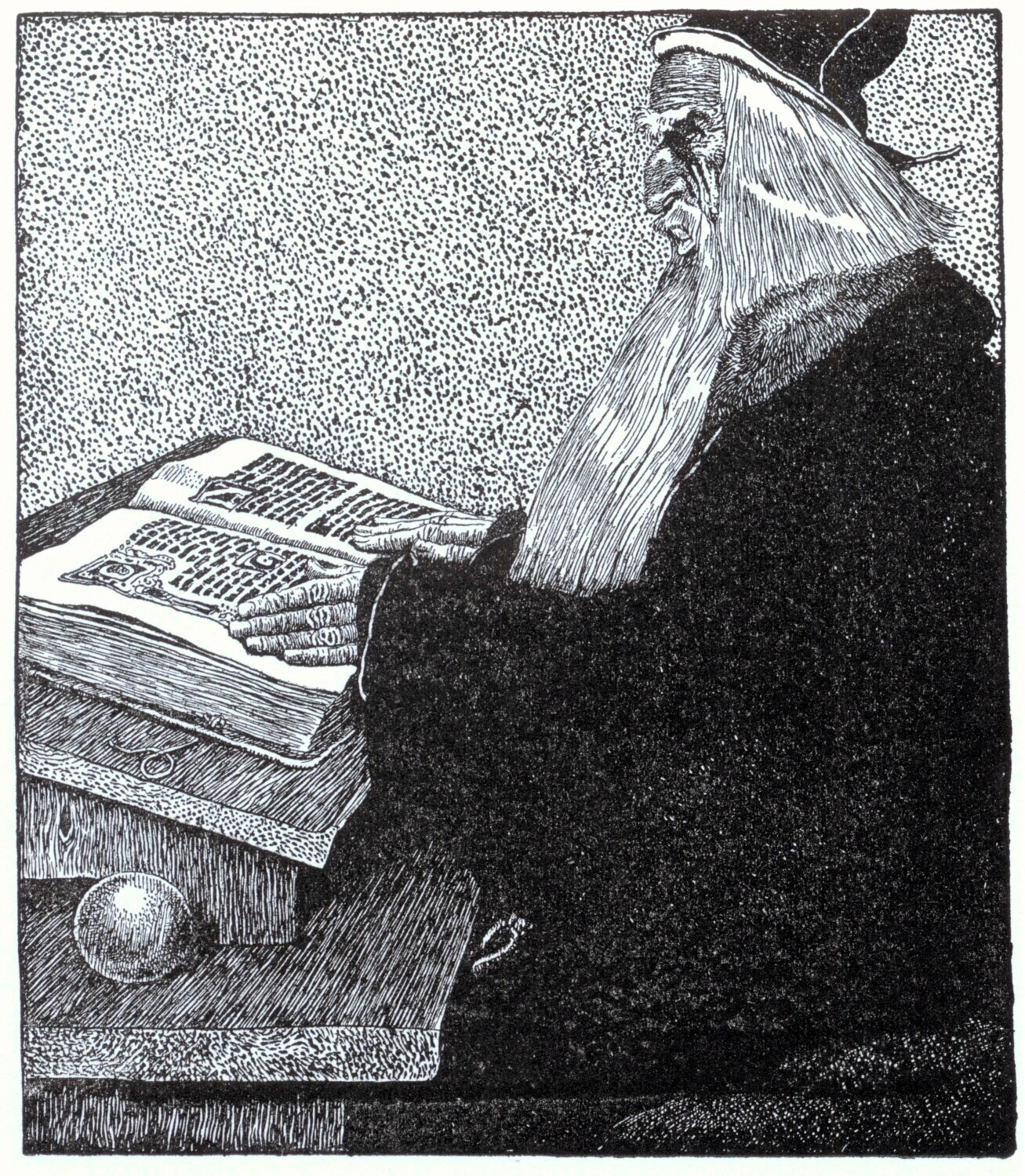
- The Enchanter Merlin, Howard Pyle's illustration for The Story of King Arthur and His Knights (1903)
- First appearance: Prophetiae Merlini (c. 1130)
- Created by: Geoffrey of Monmouth
- Based on: Myrddin Wyllt and Ambrosius Aurelianus

In-universe information
- Species: Cambion
- Occupation: Varied, including prophet, magician, bard, advisor, warrior, and others (depending on the source) (Note: As noted by Alan Lupack, "Merlin plays many roles in Arthurian literature, including bard, prophet, magician, advisor, and warrior. Though usually a figure who supports Arthur and his vision of Camelot, Merlin is, because of the stories in which he is said to be the son of a devil, sometimes presented as a villain.")
- Spouses: Varied, including Gwendolen
- Significant others: Lady of the Lake, Morgan, Sebile (romance tradition)
- Relatives: Varied, including Ganieda
- Home: "Esplumoir Merlin", British wilderness

Merlin (Welsh: Myrddin) (Note: Alternative forms of Merlin's name include the English Merlyn, the Welsh Merddyn and Myrdin, the Cornish Merdhyn, and the Breton Marzin. Thomas Malory's Winchester Manuscript of Le Morte d'Arthur used, in addition to Merlyn, also the forms Merlyon and Marylon.) is a mythical figure prominently featured in the legend of King Arthur and best known as a prophet and a magician, along with several other main roles. (Note: Peter H. Goodrich wrote, "According to authorial and cultural interests, [Merlin] assumes seven primary roles: Wild Man, Wonder Child, Prophet, Poet, Counselor, Wizard, and Lover. Most literature about the mage is selective, emphasizing and elaborating on one or more of these features and de-emphasizing or eliminating others. Merlin was not always all of these things. Instead, his figure developed by gradually accreting varied capabilities, each suggesting further capabilities and roles.") The familiar depiction of Merlin, based on an amalgamation of historical and legendary figures, was introduced by the 12th-century Catholic cleric Geoffrey of Monmouth and then built on by the French poet Robert de Boron and prose successors in the 13th century. Geoffrey's account presented Merlin as a prophet and royal advisor to Arthur's father, Uther Pendragon.

Geoffrey seems to have combined earlier Welsh tales of Myrddin and Emrys (Ambrosius), two legendary Briton prophets with no connection to Arthur, to form the composite figure that he called Merlinus Ambrosius. His rendering of the character became immediately popular, especially in Wales. Later chronicle and romance writers in France and elsewhere expanded the account to produce a more full, multifaceted character, creating one of the most important figures in the imagination and literature of the Middle Ages. Today, he continues to be highly popular in the modern era (see also the article fiction featuring Merlin).

Merlin's traditional biography casts him as an often-mad cambion, born of a mortal woman and an incubus, from whom he inherits his supernatural powers and abilities. His most notable abilities commonly include prophecy and shapeshifting. Merlin matures into an ascendant sage and engineers Arthur's birth through magic and intrigue. Later stories have Merlin as an advisor and mentor to the young king until he disappears from the tale, leaving behind a series of prophecies foretelling events to come. A popular version from the French prose cycles tells of Merlin being bewitched and forever sealed up or killed by his student, Lady of the Lake, after having fallen in love with her. Other texts variously describe his retirement, at times supernatural, or death.

== Name ==
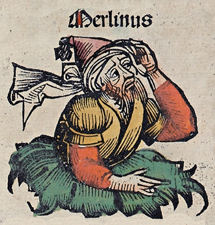
Merlinus (Merlin) in the Nuremberg Chronicle (1493)

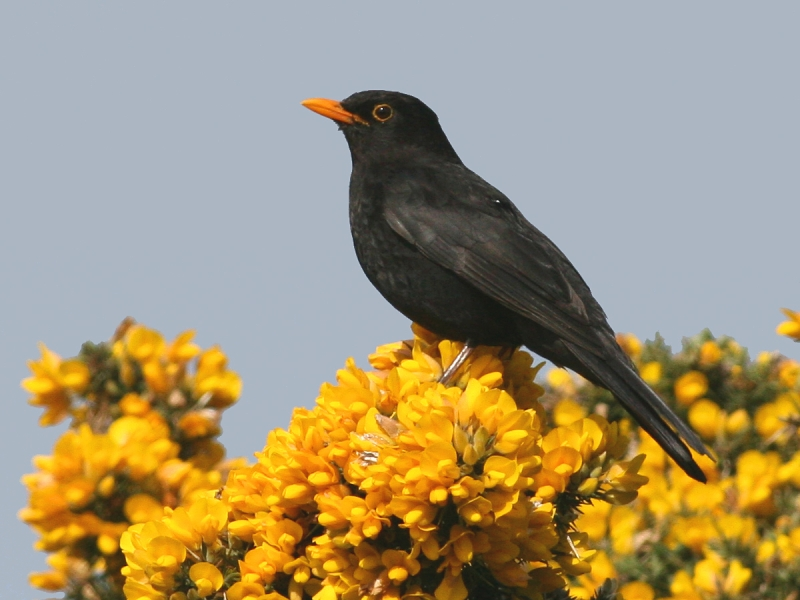
A male merle, the bird whose name may have inspired that of Merlin

The name Merlin is derived from the Welsh name of the legendary bard Myrddin that Geoffrey of Monmouth Latinised to Merlinus in his works. Medievalist Gaston Paris suggests that Geoffrey chose the form Merlinus rather than the expected *Merdinus to avoid a resemblance to the Anglo-Norman word merde (from Latin merda) for feces. Henri d'Arbois de Jubainville reduced it to the result of the "tendency of d to change into l in Indo-European languages."

'Merlin' may also be an adjective, in which case he should be called "The Merlin", from the French merle meaning common blackbird (Turdus merula). An association with this bird in French was deemed logical by Philippe Walter. According to Martin Aurell, the Latin form Merlinus is a euphony of the Welsh form Myrddin to bring him closer to the white blackbird (merle blanc (Note: This is also the title of a French fairy tale in which a magical white blackbird capable of rejuvenating others at will is the object of a quest given by an aging king. Through its power over the flow of time and its ability to restore the power of royalty, the bird is reminiscent of Merlin, and its whiteness is a mark of its magical nature, a common motif in the Celtic universe.)) into which he could metamorphose through his shamanic powers, as was notably the case for Merlin's Irish counterpart. Folklorist Jean Markale proposed that the name of Merlin is of French origin and means 'little blackbird', an allusion to the mocking and provocative personality usually attributed to him in medieval stories. According to Jean-Charles Berthet, however, the analogies between Merlin and the blackbird are more akin to a later establishment than to a real etymology, since the French name of Merlin is later than the other forms.

Myrddin may be a combination of *mer (mad) and the Welsh dyn (man), to mean 'madman'. It may also mean '[of] many names' if it was derived from the Welsh myrdd, myriad. In his Myrdhinn, ou l'Enchanteur Merlin (1868), La Villemarqué derived Marz[h]in, which he considered the original form of Merlin's name, from the Breton word marz (wonder) to mean 'wonder man'. Clas Myrddin or Merlin's Enclosure is an early name for Great Britain as stated in the third series of Welsh Triads.

Celticist Alfred Owen Hughes Jarman suggested that the Welsh name Myrddin (Welsh pronunciation: [ˈmərðɪn]) was derived from the toponym Caerfyrddin, the Welsh name for the town known in English as Carmarthen. This contrasts with the popular folk etymology that the town was named after the bard (Henri d'Arbois de Jubainville, who questioned the historical origins of Merlin, concluded that the legend was fabricated to retroactively explain the name of the town). The name Carmarthen is derived from the town's previous Roman name Moridunum, which was in turn derived from the Celtic Brittonic moridunon, 'sea fort[ress]'. Eric P. Hamp proposed a similar etymology: Morij:n, 'the maritime' or 'born of the sea'. There is no obvious connection between Merlin and the sea in the texts about him, but Claude Sterckx has suggested that Merlin's father in the Welsh texts, Morfryn, might have been a sea spirit. (Note: Philippe Walter connected it with the figure of the insular Celtic sea god, Manannán, who later could be described by Christians as a demon.)

The Welsh Myrddin could also be phonetically connected to the name Martin. Some of the powers and other attributes of the 4th-century French saint Martin of Tours (and his disciple Saint Hilaire) in hagiography and folklore are similar to these of Merlin (albeit coming from God). If a relationship between the two figures does exist, however, it may rather be a reverse one in which the Merlin tradition inspired the later accounts of the saint's miracles and life.

== Legend ==
=== Overview ===
Select stories and the earliest known sources
Episode	Text
Vortigern seeks a "fatherless child" for a blood sacrifice to strengthen his castle's tower.	Historia Brittonum (c. 828)
The first mention of Merlin's Welsh prototype, Myrddin the Wild.	Annales Cambriae (est. 10th century)
Merlin's birth from a union of a virgin and a demon. Merlin organises the construction of Stonehenge. Uther Pendragon takes on the appearance of the Duke of Cornwall through a spell by Merlin and conceives Arthur with Igraine.	Historia Regum Britanniae (c. 1136)
Blaise's intervention redeems Merlin from his intended role of the Antichrist. Merlin selects the fifty original knights of Uther's Round Table. Merlin-directed Excalibur-pulling contest proves the young Arthur's divine right to the throne of King of the Britons.	Merlin (c. 1200)
Merlin sets up the search for the Holy Grail by Arthur's Knights of the Round Table.	Prose Perceval (c. after 1200)
Merlin aids and advises the young King Arthur in his early wars and adventures. Merlin associates with Arthur's sister Morgan and tutors her in magic. Blaise writes down the story of Merlin.	Vulgate Merlin Continuation (c. before 1235)
Arthur is warned by Merlin of Mordred's birth and the coming fall of his kingdom. Entrapment of Merlin by the fairy Viviane.	Post-Vulgate Merlin Continuation (c. 1235)

Commonly in his medieval appearances, Merlin guides, helps, saves, predicts, and judges through his great wisdom. According to Gaëlle Zussa, "Merlin's literary legend presents itself as a sort of great dump in which pieces of the myth are scattered. Contemporary authors come to draw their ideas and recycle this debris to recreate an ever-new Merlin, in motion." For Berthet and Walter, the legend was constructed in stages as the ancient Celtic character was continuously reinterpreted and reinvented by Christianity, with Merlin's messianism testifying to this religious influence. Villemarqué attempted to synthesize the known information around Merlin, beginning as a figure of bard gifted with prophecy. While Merlin's prototypes were originally those of both poet and warrior king, the familiar character from the French romances became the master of amazing magical knowledge. According to a summary of the legend by Danielle Quéruel of the Bibliothèque nationale de France,

The character of Merlin is a mythical figure that was constructed through the fusion of oral traditions of Welsh origin and successive rewritings of the legend during the Middle Ages. Linked to forests and wild places, embodying a sort of universal spirit linked to the cosmic rhythms of nature, the enchanter puts his powers at the service of Britain. Between his appearances among men and at court, he retires to the forest of Northumberland and a dwelling called "Esplumoir". There awaits him a priest named Blaise whose mission is to record the history of the British kingdom.

Merlin reverts to his wild form at certain times of the year. Hairy and shaggy, his appearance recalls his wild and primitive features. He has the ability to thwart the traditional cycle of the ages of life and the passage of time: from the moment he is born, he appears older, capable of reasoning and talking like a wise man. Speaking in riddles, he reveals the future to men in obscure terms. The most important mythical trait that characterizes Merlin is his power of metamorphosis: being a protean, he can at will take the form of an animal, in particular a deer (linked to forests and a symbol of sovereignty), an appearance of a wild man, or even the aspect of a guardian of the woods; half-man, half-animal. Depending on the circumstances, he can become a peasant, a monk, a child, or an old man. He also has the power to transform others: thus, thanks to him, King Uter takes on the appearance of his vassal, the Duke of Tintagel, and can thus confound and seduce his wife Ygerne. Omniscient, Merlin dominates the human condition and places himself at the service of men.

R. Howard Bloch described Merlin's character throughout the legend:

At times a young child, adolescent, old crone, woodsman, shepherd, monk, and preudom, Merlin moves about under continually shifting guises. [...] Merlin is the representation of that which cannot be said and of everything that can be said—a shifter, trickster, joker, arbiter of value and of meaning. Also omniscient, his special knowledge of the past, of men's thoughts and intentions, of paternity, of the future, [...].

Merlin personifies the figure of the paradox—the prophet who is everywhere, yet nowhere. Representative of Satan, recuperated by God, he retains the knowledge imparted by both. A fatherless being without discernible origin, his conception having occurred without his mother's awareness, he is at the same time the protector of paternity. A latter-day Hermes, he is the inhabitant of the forest—the Wild Man—who is simultaneously the bringer of culture, the master of arts and of science, the practitioner of music, medicine, astronomy, mathematics, and calculation.

Merlin is no less adept at human relations. [...] [T]he wise child, flatterer, and liar—he represents the skilled rhetorician, master of juridical discourse, guardian of technology, and engineer of the physically impossible. Merlin [...] acts as messenger, go-between, matchmaker, mediator, peacemaker; and, these failing, as military strategist—master of ruse, maneuver, and surprise. His military triumphs are supplemented by political savvy during peacetime. The foundation of the Round Table is the product of Merlin's ingenuity as is Arthur's elaborate succession to Uter's kingdom.

=== Geoffrey and his sources ===
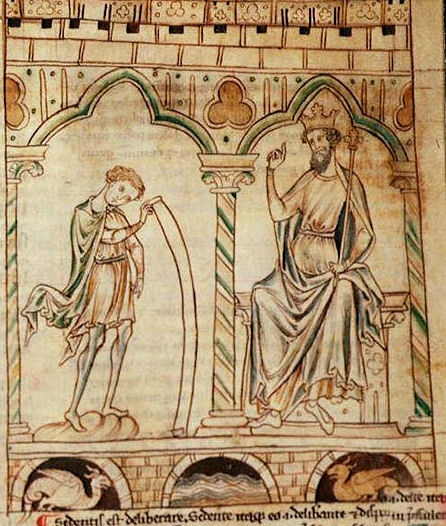
The young Merlin reading his prophecies to King Vortigern in an illustration for Geoffrey of Monmouth's Prophetiae Merlini (British Library MS Cotton Claudius B VII f.224, c. 1250).

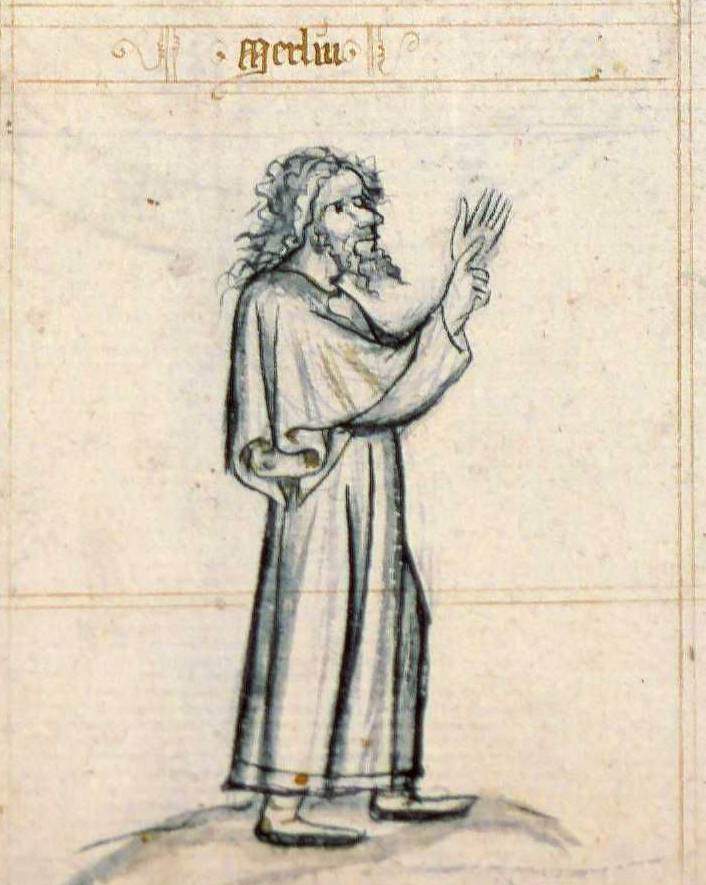
An older Merlin as portrayed in Alfonso the Wise's compilation of texts of astronomy (c. 1400). Geoffrey's Merlin practices both astronomy and astrology (in the Vita Merlini), the aspect missing from the later French stories.

Geoffrey of Manmouth's composite Merlin, imagined primarily as a prophet, is fundamentally based on the North Brythonic poet and seer Myrddin Wyllt, that is Myrddin the Wild (known as Merlinus Caledonensis or Merlin Sylvestris in later texts influenced by Geoffrey), in turn inspired by either real or legendary figure from the Welsh oral tradition that appears in 12th-century written poems such as "Afallennau Myrddin" ("Myrddin's Apple Trees") or "Yr Oianau" ("The Piglet"). Myrddin's legend has parallels with a northern Welsh and southern Scottish story of the mad prophet Lailoken (Laleocen), probably the same as Myrddin son of Morfryn (Myrddin map Morfryn) mentioned in the Welsh Triads, and with Buile Shuibhne, an Irish tale of the wandering insane king Suibihne mac Colmáin (often Anglicised to Sweeney), set after the 637 Battle of Moira. (Note: The latter story may have been the first entry of a theoretical primitive Merlin oral tradition into Christian literature.)

In Welsh poetry, Myrddin was a bard who was driven mad after witnessing the horrors of war and subsequently fled civilisation to become a wild man of the wood in the 6th century. He roamed the Caledonian Forest until he was cured of his madness by Kentigern, also known as Saint Mungo. Geoffrey had Myrddin in mind when he wrote his earliest surviving work, the Prophetiae Merlini ("Prophecies of Merlin", c. 1130), a collection of prophecies consist of a long series of predictions concerning the reign of the Saxons and the independence of Britain, which he claimed were the actual words of the legendary poet (including some distinctively apocalyptic prophecies for Geoffrey's contemporary 12th century). However, the work reveals little about Merlin's background.

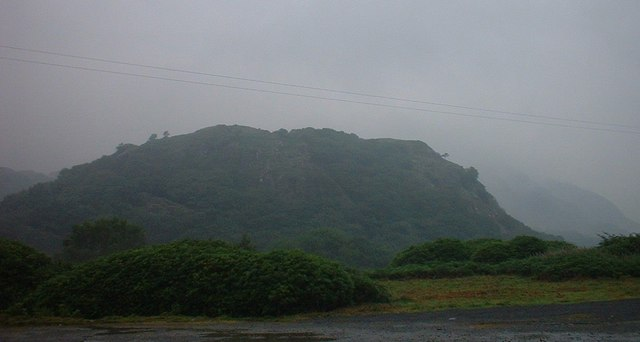
Dinas Emrys, allegedly the royal retreat of High-King Vortigern when he fled into Wales to escape the Saxons. Archaeological excavations revealed that the location was occupied to some extent in the late Roman period until the 12th century.

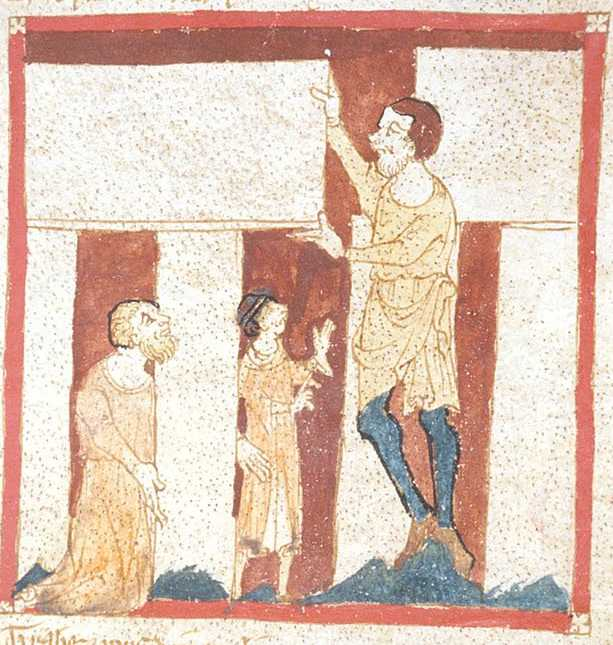
Giants help the young Merlin build Stonehenge in an illustration for a circa 1325—1350 manuscript of Wace's Roman de Brut, an expanded adaptation of Geoffrey's Historia Regum Britanniae.

Geoffrey was further inspired by Emrys (Old Welsh: Embreis), a Welsh legendary character based in part on the 5th-century historical figure of the Romano-British war leader Ambrosius Aurelianus (Welsh name Emrys Wledig, later also known as Myrddin Emrys). When Geoffrey included Merlin in his next work, Historia Regum Britanniae ("The History of the Kings of Britain", c. 1136), he supplemented his characterisation of Merlin by attributing to him a story taken from the early 9th-century Historia Brittonum attributed to Nennius, which Geoffrey adapted almost without changes. In the source text, Ambrosius was discovered when the King of the Britons, Vortigern, attempted to erect a tower at Dinas Emrys (City of Emrys). More than once, the tower collapsed before completion. Vortigen's wise men advised him that the only solution was to sprinkle the foundation with the blood of a child born without a father. Ambrosius was rumoured to be such a child. When he was brought before the king, Ambrosius revealed that below the foundation of the tower was a lake containing two dragons battling each other, representing the struggle between the invading Saxons (the white dragon) and the native Celtic Britons (the red dragon). Geoffrey included the story in his Historia Regum Britanniæ, adding the new later episodes that tie Merlin with King Arthur and his predecessors. Geoffrey stated that this Ambrosius was also called "Merlin" (Merlinus), hence Ambrosius Merlinus.

Geoffrey's account of Merlin's early life is thus based closely on the story in the Historia Brittonum. A popular theory has his Merlin as a fusion between a legendary Celtic character possibly based on a historical figure, a supposed clan leader named Myrddin, confused with the Ambrosius spoken of by Saint Gildas. At the same time, however, Geoffrey also turned Ambrosius Aurelianus into the separate character of Uther Pendragon's brother, Aurelius Ambrosius. Geoffrey added his own embellishments to the tale, which he set in Carmarthen, Wales (Welsh: Caerfyrddin). While the "fatherless" Ambrosius of the Historia Brittonum eventually reveals himself to be the son of a Roman consul, Geoffrey's Merlin is fathered by an incubus demon through a nun, daughter of the King of Dyfed (Demetae, today's South West Wales). Usually, the name of Merlin's mother is not stated, but it is given as Adhan in the oldest version of the Prose Brut, the text also naming his grandfather as King Conaan. This was the first popular account of demonic parentage motif in Western Christian literature.

The Historia's Merlin (Ambrosius Merlinus) is born all hairy like a bear and already able to speak like an adult, as well as possessing supernatural knowledge that he uses to save his mother. The story of Vortigern's tower is the same; the underground dragons, one white and one red, represent the Saxons and the Britons, and their final battle is a portent of things to come. At this point, Geoffrey inserted a long section of Merlin's prophecies, taken from his earlier Prophetiae Merlini. Geoffrey also told two further tales of the character. In the first, Merlin creates Stonehenge as a burial place for Aurelius Ambrosius, bringing the stones from Mount Killaraus in Ireland. (Note: The stones, in actuality, came from the Preseli Hills in south-west Wales.) This episode establishes Merlin as a great builder endowed with astonishing knowledge of science. Unlike in the later accounts since Layamon's Brut, Geoffrey's Merlin actually does not use magic in this episode. In the second follow-up story, Merlin's magic enables the new British king, Uther Pendragon, to enter into Tintagel Castle in disguise and to father Arthur with his enemy's wife, Igerna (Igraine). These three iconic episodes appear, separately or together, in many later adaptations of Geoffrey's account. However, Merlin subsequently disappears from the Historia narrative. He does not tutor or advise Arthur as in later versions.

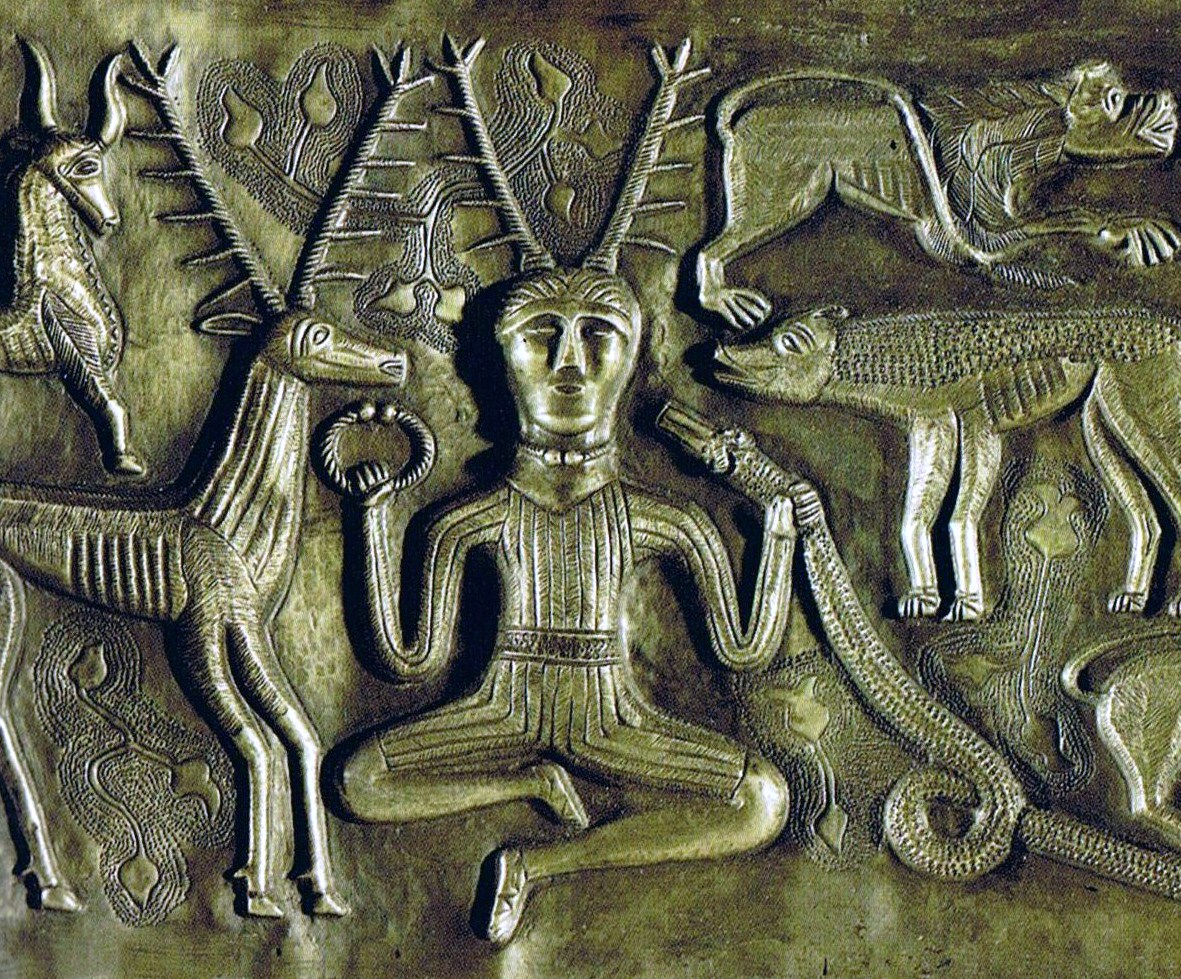
Merlin's connections with stags within the Vita and other stories may be a shadow of the belief in avatars of the Celtic "horned god", Cernunnos. As the "enchanted white stag" Otherworld motif become increasingly Christianised, monastic writers of Arthurian romances would even equate it with the Christ himself.

Geoffrey of Monmouth dealt with Merlin again in his third work, the Vita Merlini ("The Life of Merlin", 1150). He based it on stories of the original 6th-century Myrddin, set long after his time frame for the life of Merlin Ambrosius. Nevertheless, Geoffrey asserts that the characters and events of the Vita Merlini are the same as told in the Historia Regum Britanniae. According to Walter, the text is based on a slightly restored myth rather than historical sources, and should be read as a palimpsest as it contains many legendary elements (the majority purely Celtic) integrated into a biographical story in Latin. Geoffrey adapts his story to his time, but seems to have respected his sources.

Here, Merlin survives the reign of Arthur, whose fall he is told about by the bard Taliesin. Merlin himself is depicted as a Welsh king of Dyfed, a scholar, a diviner, and a cursed prophet. He loses a battle with his army and, after fleeing from the soldiers of his Scottish enemy Gwenddolau (a character inspired by the historic Brythonic king Gwenddoleu ap Ceidio), he then spends a part of his life as a madman in the woods, transforming both mentally and physically (as Merlin always do in the stories of his madness; here his changes being triggered, lycanthropy-style, by the phenomenon of red full moon). He abortively marries a woman named Guendoloena, whose new husband he later murders after arriving at their wedding while riding a stag. Cured of his madness, he eventually retires to observing stars from his house with seventy windows in the remote woods of Rhydderch. There, he is often visited by Taliesin, another soothsayer named Maeldin, and his own sister Ganieda (a Latinised name of Myrddin's sister Gwenddydd), who has become queen of the Cumbrians and is also endowed with prophetic powers. Merlin's spiritual search brings him closer to Christianity, and the text concludes with his redemption. Compared to Geoffrey's own Historia, his Vita seems to have little influence on the later portrayals of Merlin.

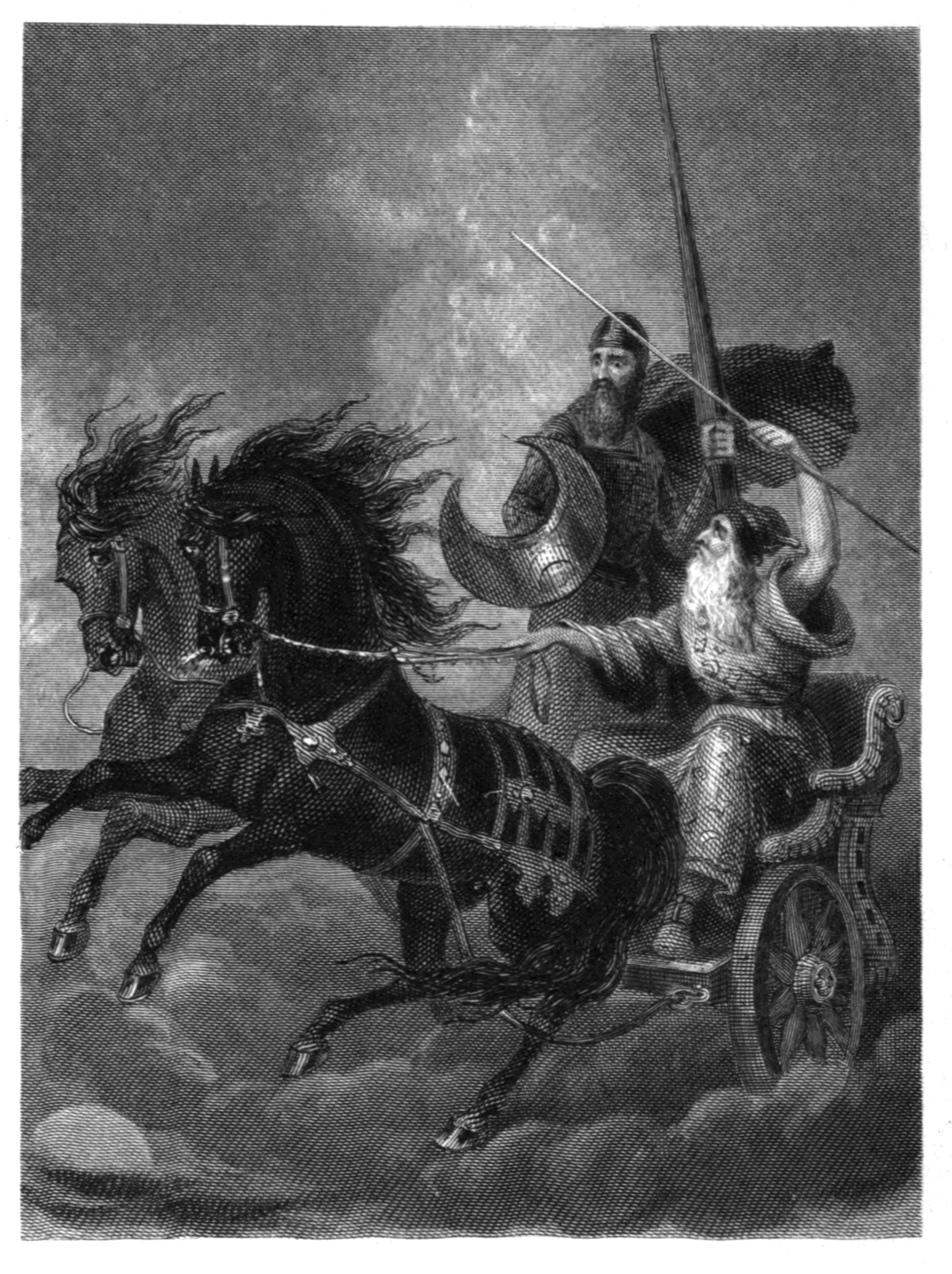
An illustration of Merlin as a druid in The Rose (1848).

A long-running debate in the Arthurian scholarship pits supporters of a historical origin of Merlin against those of a mythological origin. Mark Chorvinsky hypothesised that Merlin is based on a historical person, probably a 5th and/or 6th-century druid living in southern Scotland. Nikolai Tolstoy makes a similar argument based on the fact that early references to Merlin describe him as possessing characteristics which modern scholarship would recognize as druidical (but that sources of the time would not have recognised), the inference being that those characteristics were not invented by the early chroniclers but belonged to a real person, "the last of the druids": the Myrddin of Welsh poems, deliberately merged with another character into one by Geoffrey. Regarding the druidical origins theories, Walter noted Merlin's connections to apples and trees (including oaks) in Geoffrey and some of the other versions, and how Myrddin Wyllt, Lailoken, and Suibhne (considered variations of the same mythical theme) all three convert to the Christian faith at the end of their respective stories. Notably, Myrddin also shares similarities with the druidic bard figure of Taliesin. The two appear alongside each other in the Welsh Triads and in the Vita Merlini, as well as in the poem "Ymddiddan Myrddin a Thaliesin" ("The Conversation between Myrddin and Taliesin", where they discuss seven battles that would fill rivers with blood) from The Black Book of Carmarthen, which was dated by Rachel Bromwich as "certainly" before 1100, that is predating the Vita by at least half century while telling a different version of the same story.

The existence of one or more "historical Merlins" has been defended by others like Norma Lorre Goodrich. Such a proposed "historical Merlin" may have inspired various authors since the 6th century, but their versions would be now lost. A late version of the Annales Cambriae dubbed the "B-text", written at the end of the 13th century and regarded as influenced by Geoffrey, records that in the year 573 after "the battle of Arfderydd, between the sons of Eliffer and Gwenddolau son of Ceidio; in which battle Gwenddolau fell; Myrddin went mad." However, the earliest version of the same entry in Annales Cambriae (in the "A-text", written c. 1100), as well as a later copy (the "C-text", written towards the end of the 13th century), do not mention Myrddin. In another Black Book poem, "The Dialogue Between Merlin and His Sister Gwendydd", she dubs her brother a set of titles including the Judge of the North, the Prophet, the Master of Song, and the Warrior of Arfderydd. Nevertheless, even if Myrddin was presented as a historical figure in certain period sources, it does not necessarily mean that he really did exist.

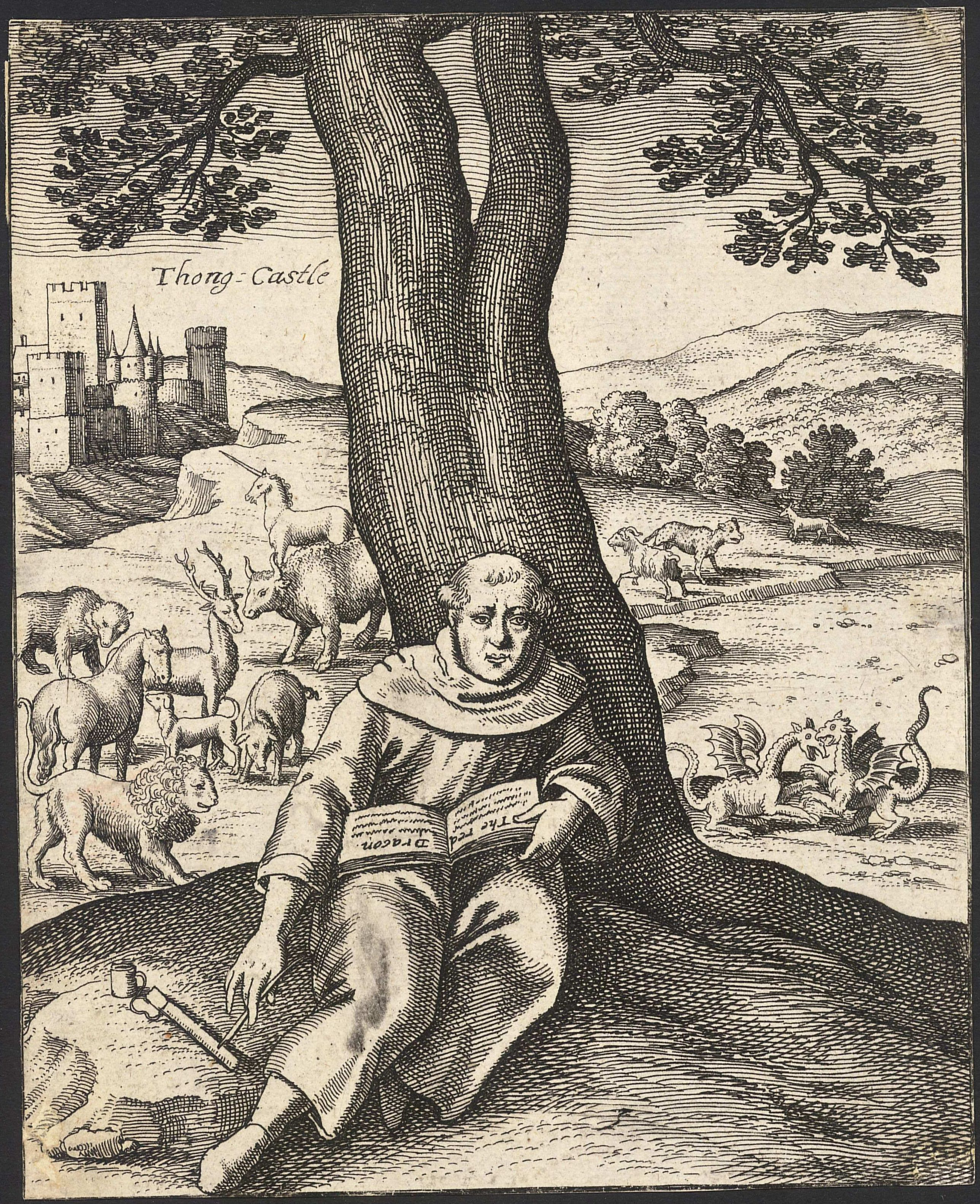
Merlin with wild and mythical beasts in a 17th-century portrayal by Wenceslaus Hollar

Some scholarship considers him to be not a literary creation of the Middle Ages, but rather an echo of a much earlier legend, that would have been rediscovered, Christianised, and gradually reinvented by different authors, including Geoffrey. According to Claude Lecouteux, Merlin comes "from the literary adaptation and Christianisation of an individual from elsewhere, from a distant past that even 12th-century authors probably no longer understood." Legendary stories surrounding Merlin may thus have their origins in a Celtic or even pre-Celtic proto-myth, later evolved by the influence of Christianity as well as by the aristocratic traditions of the Britons of their time. Some "folkloric" beliefs, including a set of poetic and narrative traditions, would survive orally until the 12th century, when Christian clerics committed this oral material to writing. In his earliest expressions, according to Walter, Merlin embodied magical sovereignty and shamanic royalty, quite far from the later warrior and priest functions, and his power was essentially spiritual. The powers attributed to Merlin show similarities to shamanic practices, suggesting that his figure may have originated in a primitive Eurasian shamanism, that is feral states, gifts of prophecy, and (especially) transformation into a bird. In more of arguably shamanistic characteristics, Merlin of the Vita rides a stag accompanied by a wolf and understands all animals that, in turn, all can understand him. Markale suggested that an original Merlin figure may have been an avatar of Cernunnos, a Celtic god of nature. For Villemarqué, a possible origin of the legend of Merlin may be the Roman story of Marsus, a son of the goddess Circe, which would eventually influence the Breton and Welsh tales of a supernaturally-born bard or enchanter named Marzin or Marddin.

=== Romance reimagination ===
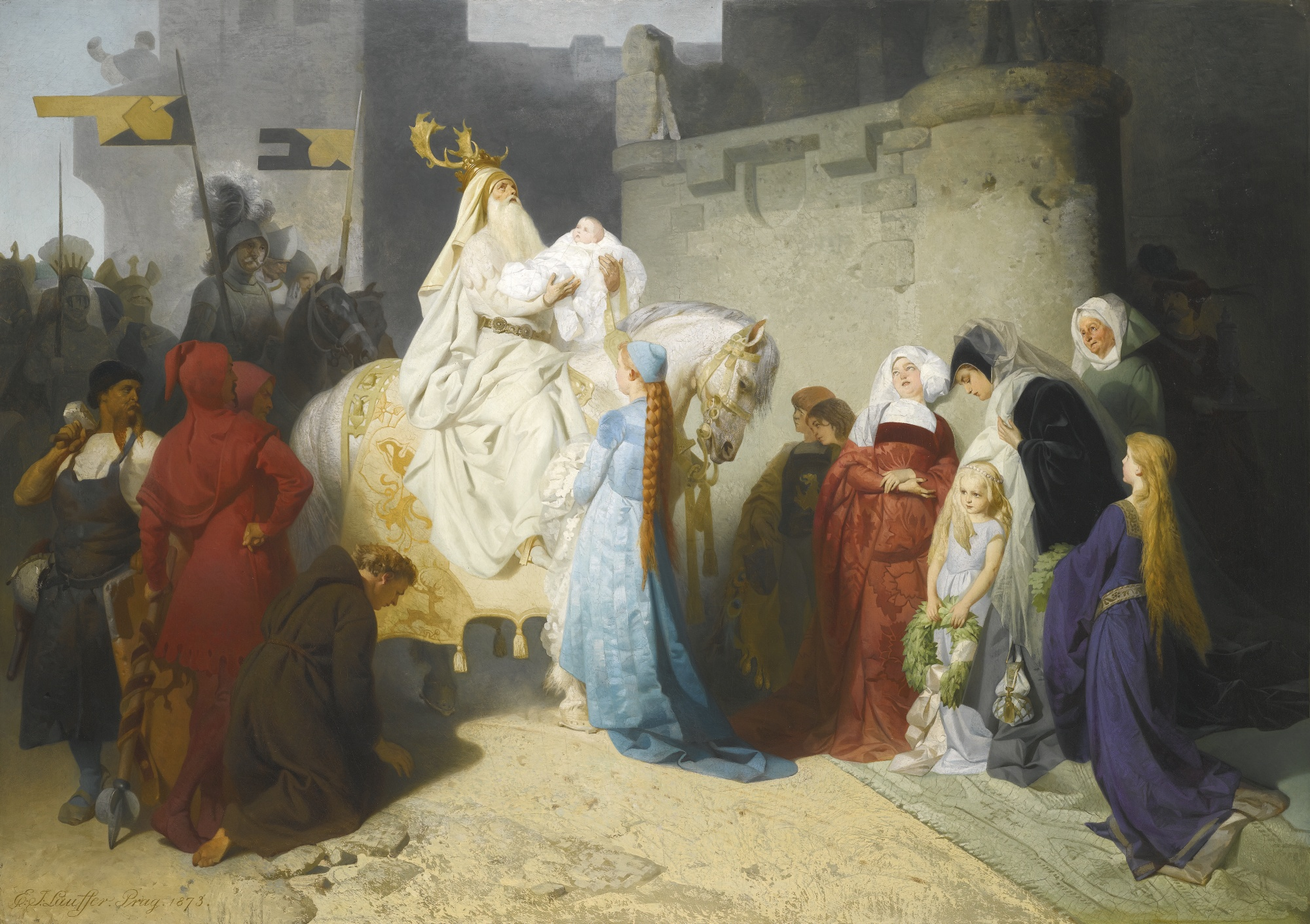
Emil Johann Lauffer's painting of Merlin taking the newborn Arthur to be secretly raised by Ector. Merlin is often linked to stag themes in the legend, either riding on one or transforming himself into one, in an apparent association with old Celtic pagan beliefs and their Christianisation.

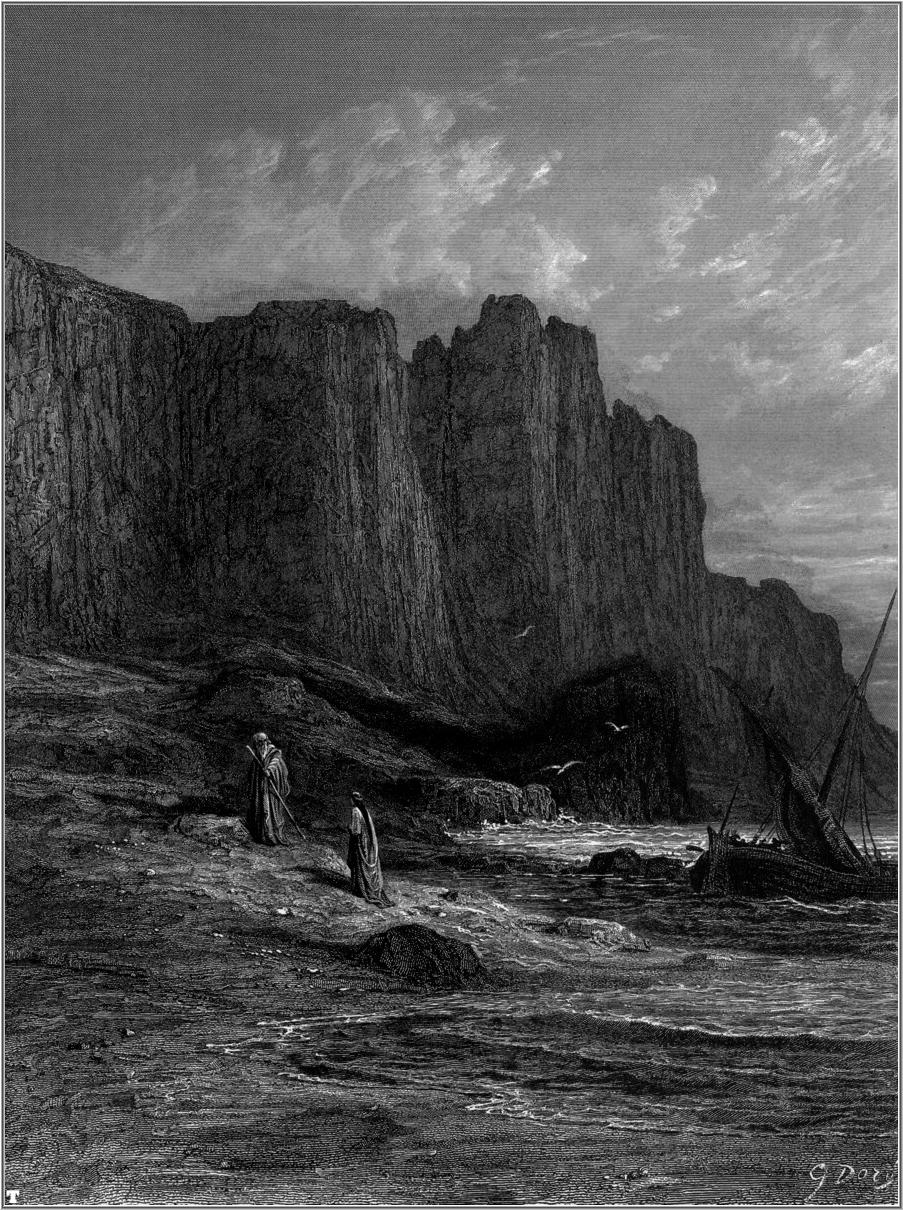
Gustave Doré's image of Merlin at his cave.

Around the turn of the 13th century, Robert de Boron retold and expanded on this material in Merlin, an Old French epic poem inspired by Wace's Roman de Brut, an Anglo-Norman creative adaptation of Geoffrey's Historia, but not based directly on it. The work presents itself as the story of Merlin's life as told by Merlin himself to be written down by the "real" author, while the actual author claimed merely to translate the story into French. Only a few lines of what is believed to be the original text have survived, but a popular prose version had a great influence on the emerging genre of Arthurian-themed chivalric romance.

The French Merlin links the two British traditions, that of the fatherless child prophet and that of the wild man. As in the Historia, Merlin is created as a demon spawn, but in Robert's account, he is explicitly to become the Antichrist intended to reverse the effect of the Harrowing of Hell. The infernal plot is thwarted when a priest named Blaise (the story's narrator and perhaps Merlin's divine twin in a hypothetical now-lost original Breton oral tradition (Note: Blaise also figures within the text as its supposed original author, decades later writing down Merlin's own words in a third-person narration. According to Philippe Walter, Blaise, whose name resembles bleiz, the Old Breton word for wolf, may have originally been a wolf-man double figure of Merlin in pagan-influenced tales before he was thoroughly Christianised and turned into Merlin's scribe and confidant. This association would explain Merlin's animal-like appearance at birth and the name Lailoken, 'the twin'.)) is contacted by the child's mother: Blaise immediately baptizes the boy at birth, thus freeing him from the power of Satan and his intended destiny. The demonic legacy invests Merlin (already able to speak fluently even as a newborn) with a preternatural knowledge of the past and present, which is supplemented by God, who gives the boy prophetic knowledge of the future. The text lays great emphasis on Merlin's power to shapeshift, (Note: Merlin appears as a woodcutter with an axe about his neck, big shoes, a torn coat, bristly hair, and a large beard. He is later found in the forest of Northumberland by a follower of Uther disguised as an ugly man and tending a great herd of beasts. He then appears first as a handsome man and then as a beautiful boy. Years later, he approaches Arthur disguised as a peasant wearing leather boots, a wool coat, a hood, and a belt of knotted sheepskin. He is described as tall, black, and bristly, and as seeming cruel and fierce. Finally, he appears as an old man with a long beard, short and hunchbacked, in an old torn woolen coat, who carries a club and drives a multitude of beasts before him.) his joking personality, and his connection to the Holy Grail, the quest for which he later foretells. It presents him during his childhood as a being both disturbing and prodigious, describes Merlin's efforts to escape the influence of his diabolical ancestry, and contains many scenes in which Merlin laughs (especially when he practices magic). Robert does not give much space to Merlin's madness, but his laughter may reflect the otherness of his mind.

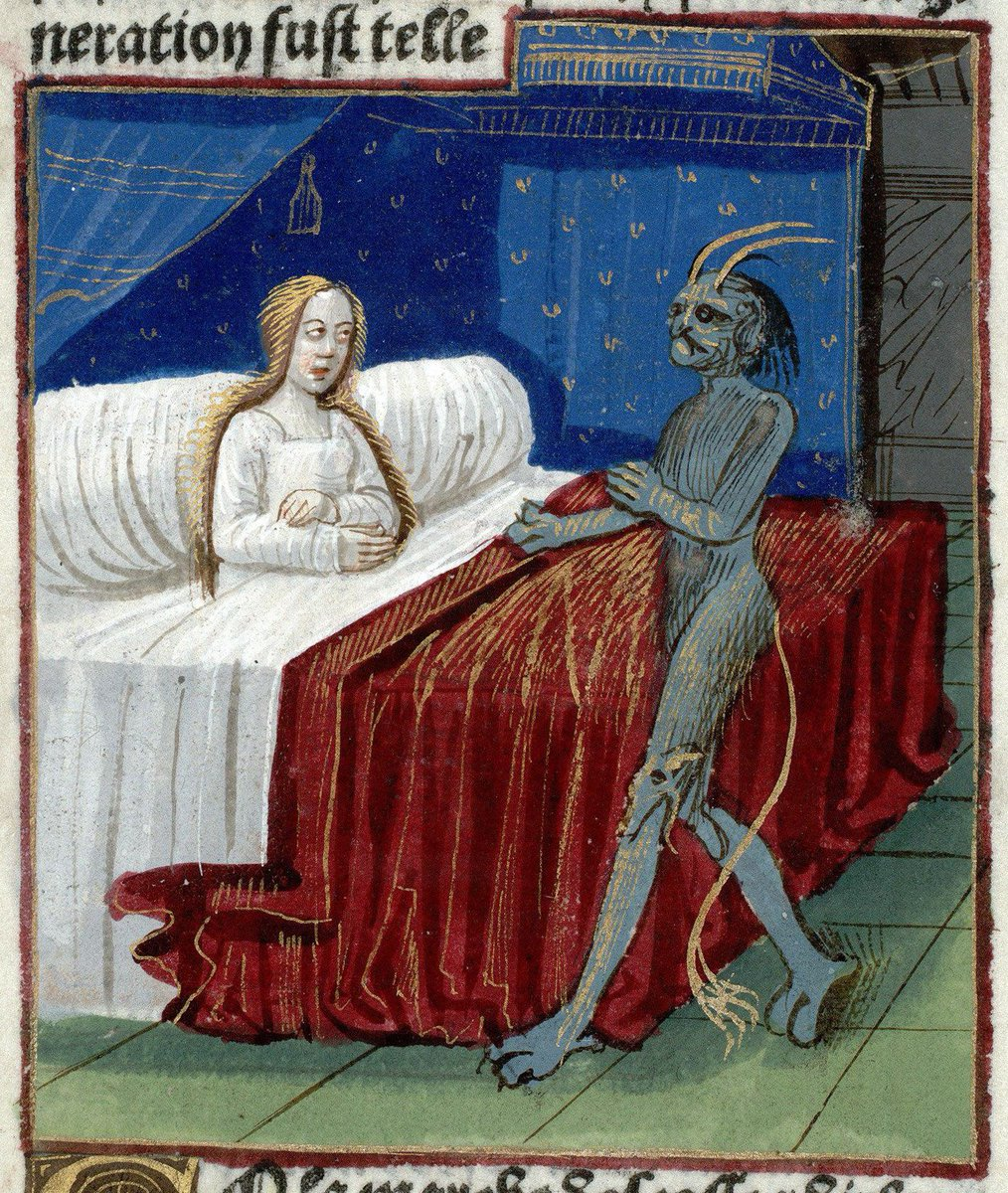
The conception of Merlin as depicted in a circa 1494 manuscript of the Prose Lancelot (his father's portrayal in this style is common in illustrations, but not representative of the actual descriptions within the texts (Note: As noted by Miranda Griffin, "while demons are often portrayed with quite extraordinary bodies in illuminations in manuscripts of the Merlin," actual descriptions of Merlin's father tend to talk of an airborne spirit, sometimes taking material shape of a handsome man.)).

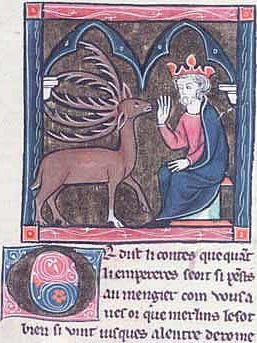
Merlin in the form of a stag in a 1286 manuscript of the Vulgate Suite du Merlin. In his animal form, Merlin retains his powers and the ability to speak.

Merlin is thought to be part of a trilogy of Robert's stories that tell the history of the Grail over the centuries, sometimes dubbed the Little Grail Cycle. The narrative of the Prose Merlin is largely based on Geoffrey's familiar tale of Vortigern's Tower, Uther's war against the Saxons, and Arthur's conception. New in this retelling are the episodes of the baby Arthur being secreted away by Merlin (presenting himself successively as an old man to abduct the newborn Arthur, then as a young man to hand him over to be raised by Ector), and of the young Arthur years later drawing the sword from the stone, an event orchestrated by Merlin in the role of kingmaker. Earlier, Merlin also instructs Uther to establish the quasi-religious chivalric order of the Knights of the Round Table for fifty members, handpicked by Merlin, following his own act of creating the table itself as a replica of both the original Last Supper table and the subsequent table of Joseph of Arimathea. (Note: Merlin's apparently own creation of the Round Table as described in the Prose Merlin (it is not included in the surviving fragment of the poem), absent of any Biblical connections, contradicts the plot and themes of Joseph d'Arimathea, a related work also attributed to Robert de Boron, and may be thus an invention of the prose author. Furthermore, the Modena manuscript of the Didot-Perceval continuation of Merlin, sometimes also attributed to Robert, features only 13 seats at the Round Table instead of 50.) The text ends with the coronation of Arthur. In the Perceval en prose (alternatively known as the Didot Perceval and usually attributed to Robert as the final part of his purported cycle), where Merlin is the initiator of the Grail Quest and cannot die until the end of days. He eventually retires after Arthur's downfall by turning himself into a bird and entering the mysterious esplumoir, (Note: The proposed Merlin-blackbird connection may explain the mystery of the esplumoir Merlin. In the Celtic imagination, the blackbird was considered a bird of the Otherworld, particularly because of its melodious song which recalls that of the bards and transports the listener.) never to be seen again.

The story of the prose version of Merlin was resumed in the 13th-century Merlin Continuation, telling of King Arthur's early wars and Merlin's role in them. In this text, also known as the Suite du Merlin, the mage both predicts and, wielding elemental magic, influences the course of battles, (Note: In one example of Merlin's interventions, the Vulgate version has him conjure a magical mist that causes the forces of Arthur's enemy King Amant to clash with the Saxon army at Carmelide. On another occasion, Merlin comes to aid Arthur a dragon banner that comes to life and throws fire and flames out of its mouth. Merlin's part in these wars is depicted in more detail in the recently-found Bristol Merlin fragment.) in addition to helping the young Arthur in other ways. Eventually, he arranges the reconciliation between Arthur and his rivals, and the surrender of the defeated Saxons and their departure from Britain.

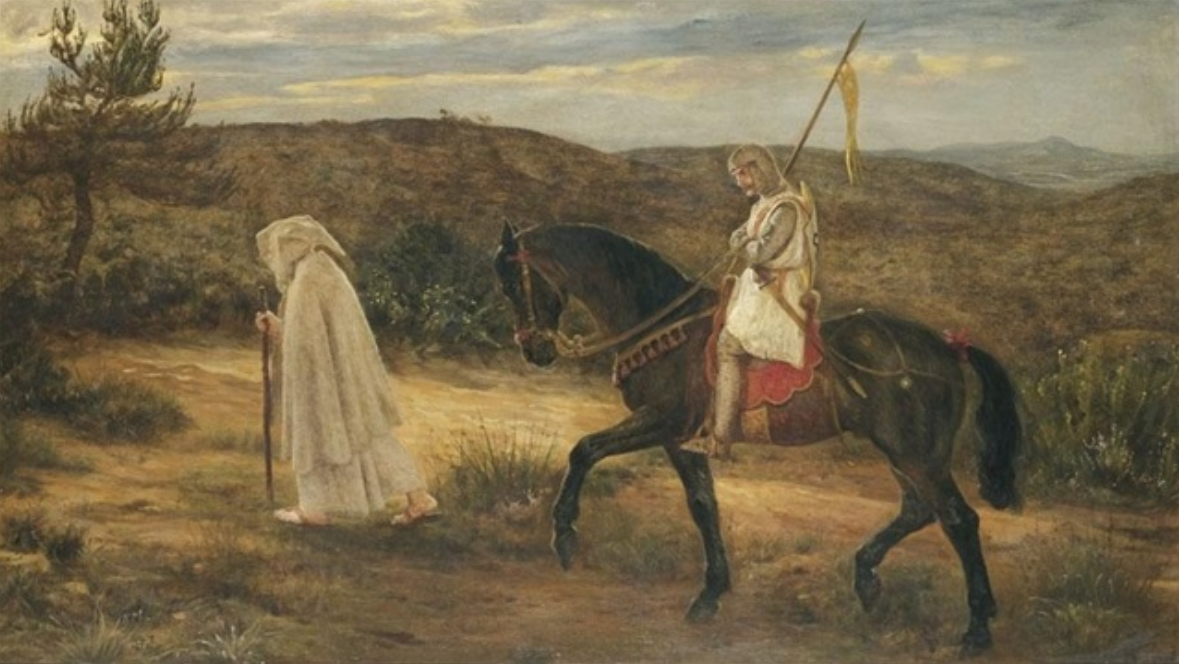
Merlin and Lancelot by James Archer (1871)

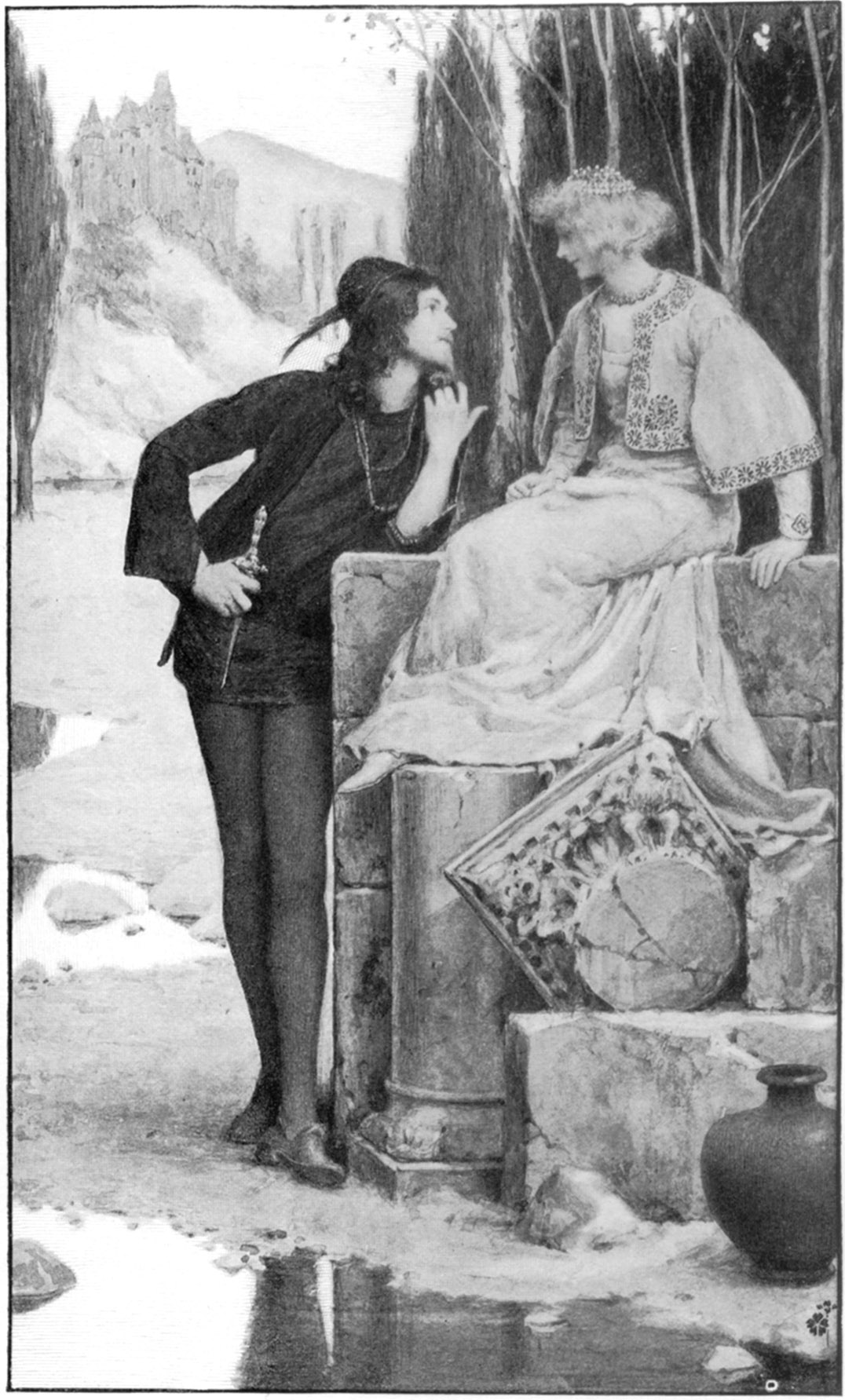
Albert Herter's illustration from Thomas Wentworth Higginson's Tales of the Enchanted Islands of the Atlantic (1899)
"Merlin, changed into the appearance of a fair young squire, by degrees made acquaintance with Vivian, who told him who she was."

This extended prose rendering of Merlin was incorporated as a foundation of the Lancelot-Grail, a vast cyclical series of Old French prose works also known as the Vulgate Cycle, in the form of the Estoire de Merlin (Story of Merlin), also known as the Vulgate Merlin or the Prose Merlin. There, while not identifying his mother, it is stated that Merlin was named after his grandfather on her side. The Vulgate's Prose Lancelot further relates that after growing up in the borderlands between 'Scotland' (i.e. Pictish lands) and 'Ireland' (i.e. Argyll), Merlin "possessed all the wisdom that can come from demons, which is why he was so feared by the Bretons and so revered that everyone called him a holy prophet and the ordinary people all called him their god." In the Vulgate Cycle's version of Merlin, his acts include arranging the consummation of Arthur's desire for "the most beautiful maiden ever born," Lady Lisanor of Cardigan, resulting in the birth of Arthur's illegitimate son Lohot from before the marriage to Guinevere.

A further reworking and an alternative continuation of the Prose Merlin were included within the subsequent Post-Vulgate Cycle as the Post-Vulgate Suite du Merlin or the Huth Merlin, the so-called "romantic" rewrite (as opposed to the so-called "historical" original of the Vulgate). The work contains a series of prophecies entrusted to Blaise by Merlin and presents the Grail as the central point of all of them. It adds some content, such as Merlin providing Arthur with the sword Excalibur through a Lady of the Lake, while either removing or altering many other episodes. Merlin's magical interventions in the Post-Vulgate versions of his story are relatively limited and markedly less spectacular, even compared to the magical feats of his own students, and his character becomes less moral. In addition, Merlin's prophecies include sets of alternative possibilities (meaning the future can be changed) rather than sure outcomes. The Post-Vulgate Cycle has Merlin warn Arthur of how the birth of his other son will bring great misfortune and ruin to his kingdom, which then becomes a self-fulfilling prophecy—eventually (long after Merlin is gone), his advice to dispose of the baby Mordred through an event evoking the Biblical Massacre of the Innocents leads to the deaths of many, among them Arthur.

=== Other aspects and developments ===
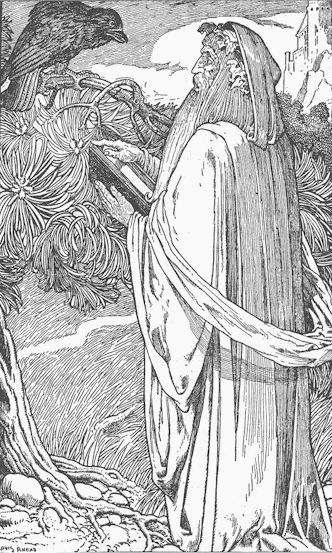
Merlin, the Enchanter by Louis Rhead (1923). Merlin has been often connected with birds, (Note: In addition to the links to blackbirds in French, Falco columbarius, a species of falcon, is known as merlin in English. Some modern fiction authors take use of this analogy.) including transformation stories since the early tale of Suibhne.

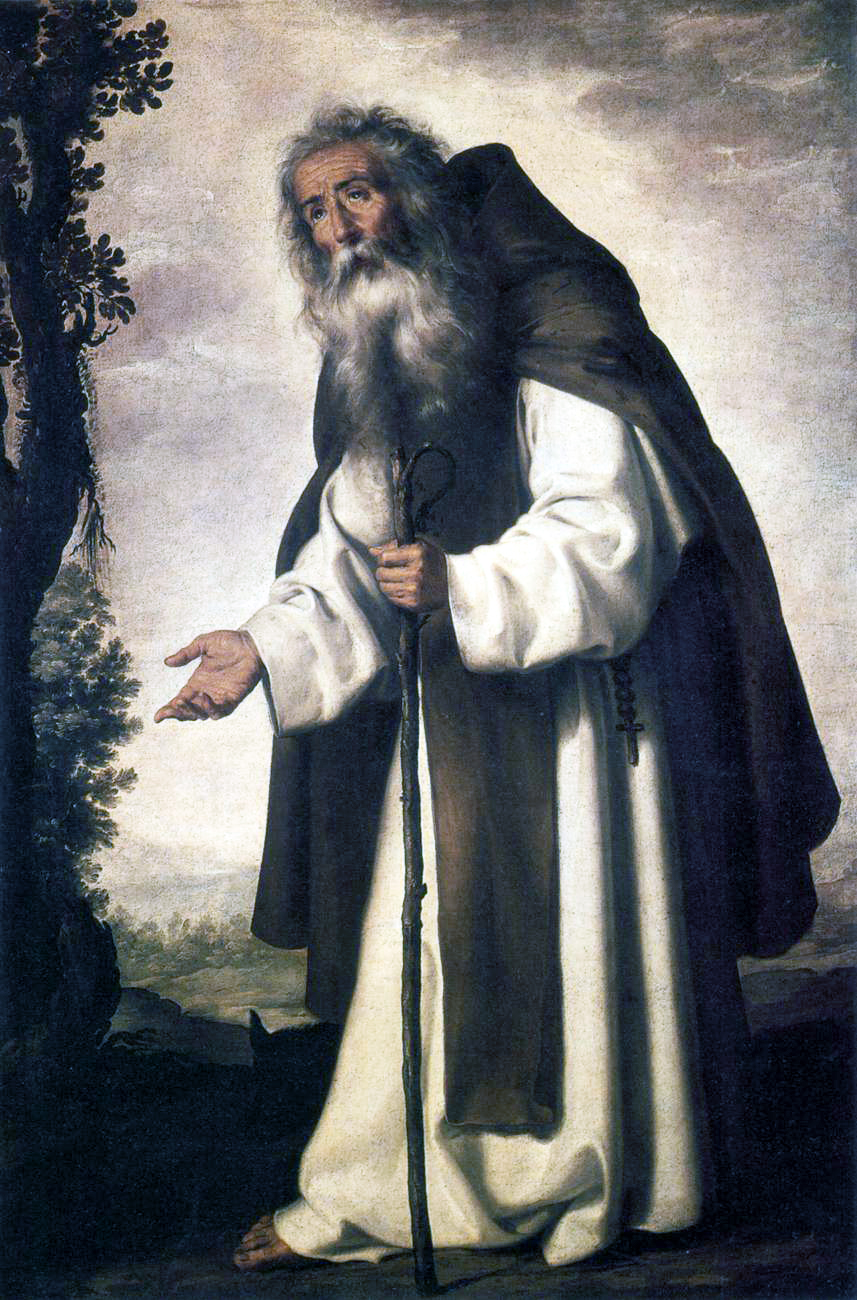
Through his life as a hermit monk close to nature and in an association with the animal world, Saint Anthony the Great is comparable to Merlin.

As the Arthurian myths were retold, Merlin's prophetic "seer" aspects were sometimes de-emphasised (or even seemingly vanish entirely, as in the fragmentary and more fantastical Livre d'Artus) in favor of portraying him as a wizard and an advisor to the young Arthur, sometimes in the struggle between good and evil sides of his character, and living in deep forests, connected with nature. The forest setting often serves as Merlin's natural and favorite domain, dating back to his origins in Welsh and Irish poetry. In the romances, he may take refuge from Arthur's court to live with Blaise in a forest in Northumberland, which over time became identified with Brocéliande. Through his ability to change his shape, he may appear as a "wild man" figure, evoking his prototype Myrddin Wyllt, as a civilised man of any age (including as a very young child), or even as a talking animal. His guises can be highly deformed and animalistic even when Merlin is presenting as a human or humanoid being. (Note: In the Livre d'Artus, for instance, Merlin enters Rome in the form of a huge stag with a white fore-foot. He bursts into the presence of Julius Caesar (here Arthur's contemporary) and tells the emperor that only the wild man of the woods can interpret the dream that has been troubling him. Later, he returns in the form of a black, shaggy man, barefoot, with a torn coat. In another episode, he decides to do something that will be spoken of forever. Going into the forest of Brocéliande, he transforms himself into a herdsman carrying a club and wearing a wolf-skin and leggings. He is large, bent, black, lean, hairy, and old, and his ears hang down to his waist. His head is as big as a buffalo's, his hair reaches his waist, he has a hump on his back, his feet and hands are backward, he is hideous, and he is over 18 feet tall. By his arts, he calls a herd of deer to come and graze around him.) In that, Merlin recalls the tradition of pagan deities and creatures of nature and forests, such as Silvanus (who, like Merlin, can appear as an old man and possess the strength of a young man), Faunus (in the Post-Vulgate Cycle, Merlin himself actually tells a Christianised version of the Greco-Roman myth of Faunus and Diana), and the wild man.

"Merlin", Aubrey Beardsley's illustration in the 1894 Dent edition of Thomas Malory's Le Morte d'Arthur. Malory's telling has long remained the main source of Arthurian inspiration in the English-speaking world.

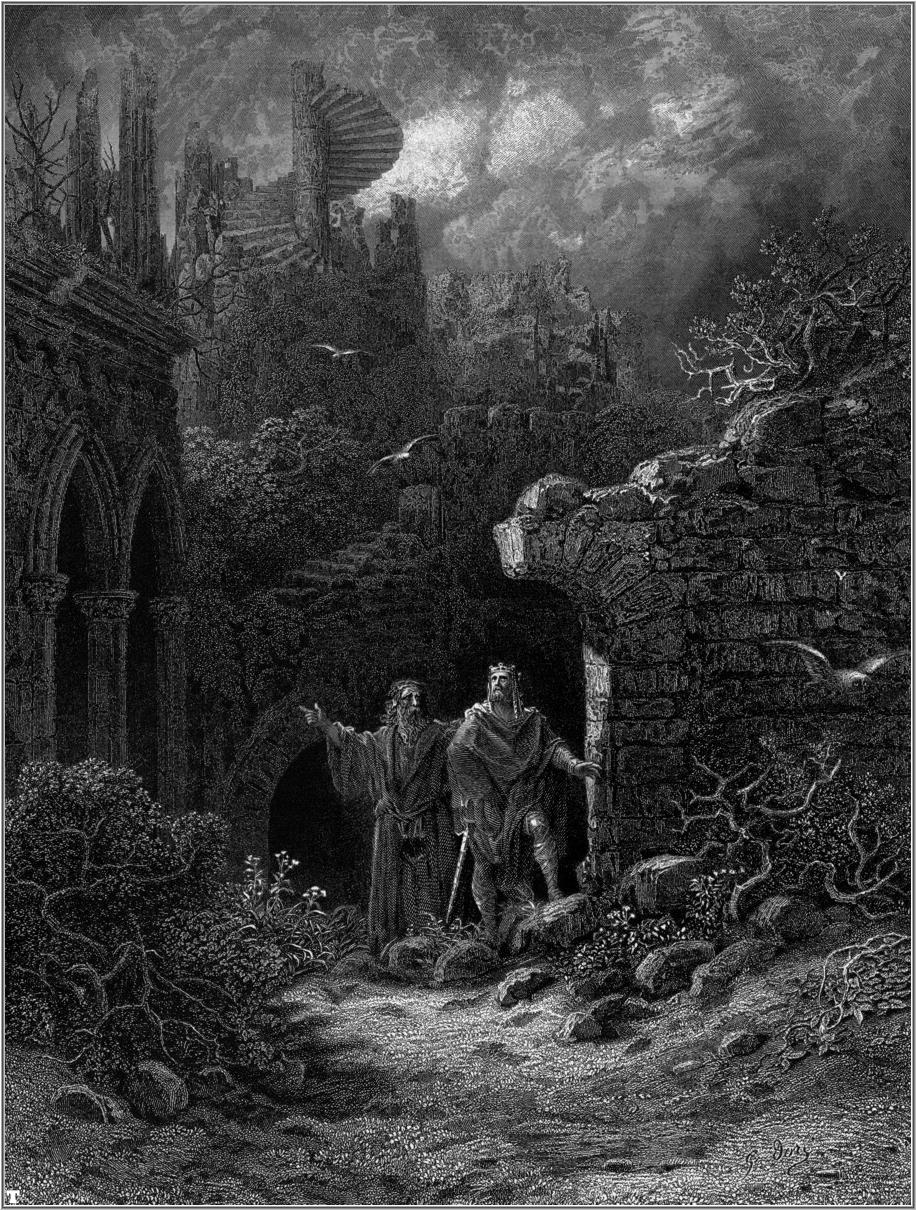
Merlin depicted in Doré's 1867 illustration for Idylls of the King by Lord Alfred Tennyson.

Both Merlin and its continuations have been adapted in verse and prose, translated into several languages, and further modified to various degrees by other authors. Notably, the Post-Vulgate Suite (along with an earlier version of the Prose Merlin) was the main source for the opening section of Thomas Malory's English-language compilation work Le Morte d'Arthur which formed a now-iconic version of the legend. Compared to some of his French sources (such as the Vulgate Lancelot which described Merlin as "treacherous and disloyal by nature, like his [demon] father before him"), Malory limited the extent of the negative association of Merlin and his powers. Malory's Merlin is rarely condemned as demonic by other characters, such as King Lot, being presented as an ambiguous trickster.

The earliest English verse romance concerning Merlin is Of Arthour and of Merlin of the late 13th century, which drew from the chronicles and the Vulgate Cycle. In English-language medieval texts that conflate Britain with the Kingdom of England, the Anglo-Saxon enemies against whom Merlin aids first Uther and then Arthur tend to be replaced by either the Saracens or unnamed heathen invaders. The earliest Merlin work written in Germany was Caesarius of Heisterbach's Latin theological text Dialogus Miraculorum (1220). Among other medieval works dealing with the Merlin legend is the 13th-century French romance Roman de Silence, and the 13th-14th Italian story collection Il Novellino that pictures him as a righteous seer chastising people for their sins.

Conversely, the Orygynale Cronykil of Scotland, which sympathizes with Mordred as usual in Scottish chronicle tradition, particularly attributes Merlin's supernatural evil influence on Arthur to its very negative portrayal of his rule. He is also a villainous figure, opposing Arthur's daughter, in the late Irish romance Eachtra Mhelóra agus Orlando. Merlin is presented as inherently evil in the so-called non-cyclic Lancelot, in which he was born as the "fatherless child" from not a supernatural rape of a virgin but a consensual union between a lustful demon and an unmarried beautiful young lady, and was never baptised. It even says that he never did anything good in his life. Wilhelm von Österreich by Johann von Würzburg (1324) paints a villainous portrait of Merlin as a magician born of a devil in an otherwise non-Arthurian story.

In the Second Continuation of Perceval, the Story of the Grail, written around 1210, a young daughter of Merlin called the Lady of the High Peak of Mont Dolorous, appears to guide Perceval towards the Grail Castle. Merlin's usually unspecified mother is sometimes called Adhan or Aldan, or Optima, as in Bauduin (Baudouin) Butor's 1294 romance known as either Les Fils du Roi Constant or Pandragus et Libanor. Paolino Pieri's 14th-century Italian La Storia di Merlino, which invents a new version of the story of Merlin's youth, names his mother as Marinaia. Ulrich Füetrer's 15th-century Buch der Abenteuer, in the section based on Albrecht von Scharfenberg's lost Merlin, turns Merlin into father of Uter, effectively making Merlin's grandson Arthur a part-devil too. The eponymous redeemed half-demon Gowther is Merlin's half-brother in the 15th-century English poem Sir Gowther. The Liber Exemplorum (1275) features a demon who claims to know Merlin perfectly. One version of the Prose Tristan also makes Merlin essentially a "half-brother" of the monster known as the Questing Beast.

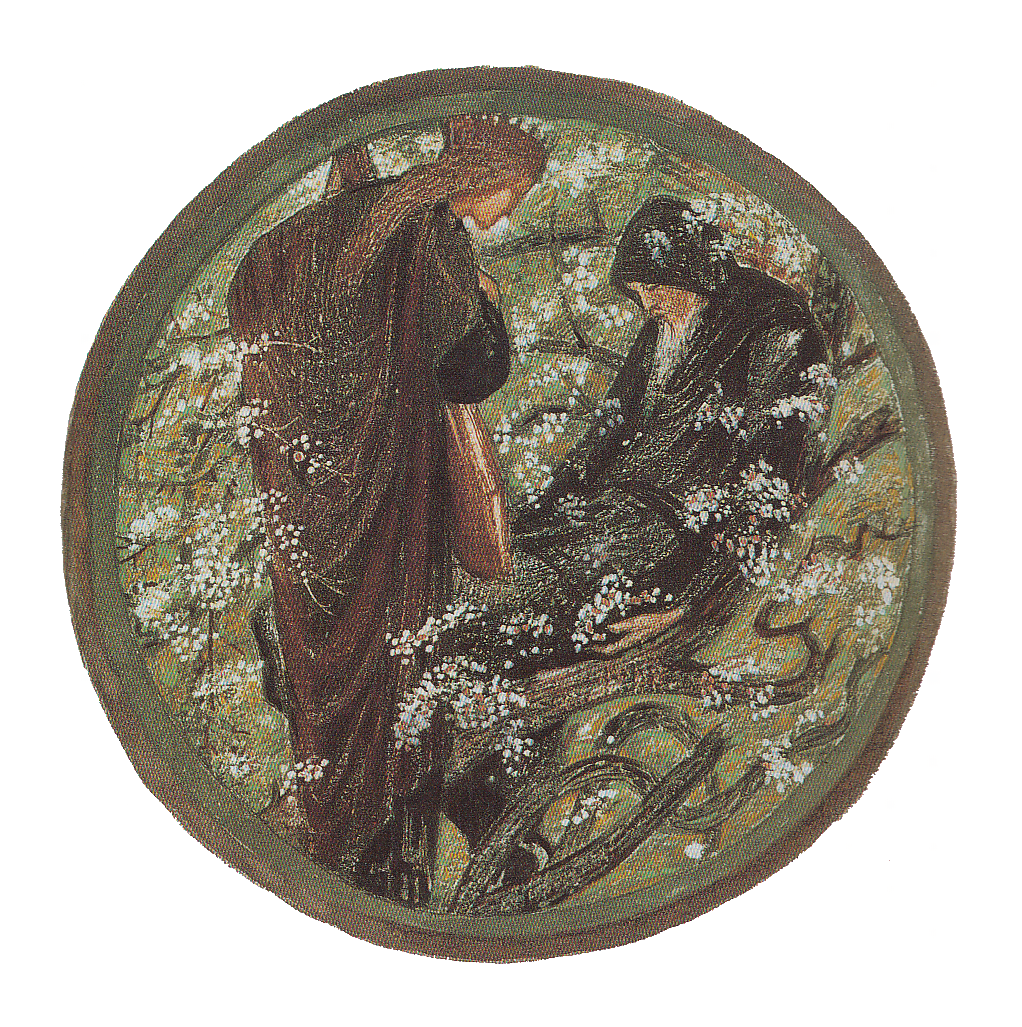
Witches' Tree (c. 1882–1898, printed 1905) by Edward Burne-Jones

In much of the prose tradition, Merlin has a major weakness—young beautiful women of femme fatale archetype. This is what eventually leads him to his doom by a Lady of the Lake. Besides her, Merlin's apprentice in chivalric romances is often King Arthur's half-sister, Morgan, who is sometimes depicted as Merlin's lover and sometimes as just his unrequited love interest. (Note: As summarised by Anne Berthelot, depending on the version of the narrative, "it may be that a lustful Merlin seduces an (almost) innocent Morgue [Morgan], thus pushing her to her déchéance (downfall). Or Morgue may appear as an ambitious and unscrupulous bitch ready to seduce an old tottering Merlin in order to gain the wisdom he alone can dispense.") Contrary to many modern works in which they are archenemies, Merlin and Morgan are never opposed to each other in any medieval text, other than she forcibly rejecting him in some of them. Merlin's love for Morgan is so great that he even lies to the king to save her in the Huth Merlin, which is the only instance of him ever intentionally misleading Arthur. (Note: Merlin also otherwise protects Morgan and continues to aid her when she requests help in some other texts. The Prophéties de Merlin tells of Morgan's reaction to the news of his entombment by the Lady of the Lake, saying she was "at the same time glad and sorry" and "sorry and worried, because if she were to have need of Merlin, she would be ruined for want of him.")

In the originally Venetian prose romance Prophéties de Merlin, alternatively known as the Prophécies de Merlin (c. 1274–79), he further tutors Sebile, two other witch queens, and the Lady of the Isle of Avalon (Dama di Isola do Vallone). Those who learn sorcery from Merlin also include the male wizard Mabon in the Post-Vulgate Merlin Continuation and the Prose Tristan, and the Wise Damsel (Savia Donzella / Savia Damigella) in the Italian prose romance Historia di Merlino. (Note: As for the latter, the Tristan tradition of Italy identifies her as the usually unnamed fairy enchantress who abducted Tristan's father Meliodas to be her lover and turns her relation with Merlin into deadly hostility. In some versions, including the Tavola Ritonda, Merlin (Merlino) first appears as a knight to foretell the death of Meliodas' wife Eliabella, who will search for her husband without success while pregnant with Tristan. Later, he gathers and leads a group of the knights of the realm Lyonesse (Leonis) to the evil Wise Damsel's magically hidden and otherwise unaccessible tower or castle deep in the wilderness of the forest Dirlantes (the same Darnantes where Merlin himself meets his end in some versions) on a quest to slay her and free Meliodas. Years later, Tristan and Iseult take refuge in her now abandoned but still enchanted castle while hiding from King Mark.) While Merlin's apprentices are able to gain or expand their magical powers through him, his unique prophetic powers cannot be passed on.

=== Merlin's prophecies ===
The works dealing with Merlin's prophecies did not end with Geoffrey's Prophetiae. Abundant prophetic literature attributed to Merlin is divided into two main currents, the prophecies of the British Isles and those of the European continent, different in their themes, purposes, and inspirations. Particularly in Britain, Merlin remained as much as a prophet as a magician up to and including the 16th century, when political content in the style of Agrippa d'Aubigné continued to be written using Merlin's name to guarantee their authenticity. For instance, John of Cornwall's 12th-century Latin poem Prophecy of Merlin contains a selection of 'updated' prophecies from Geoffrey's Prophetae that come with the author's interpretations relating them to his contemporary Cornish and English political affairs. The late medieval Vita di Merlino con le sue Profetie (1379), combining Merlin romance material and prophecies related to the author's recent contemporary history and politics, became the first Arthurian text printed in Italy.

The influential Prophéties de Merlin (later abridged and clarified in Pieri's Storia) was written in French but obviously by an Italian in Venice (falsely claiming to be one "Richard from Ireland") on the bidding of Frederick II, Holy Roman Emperor and to propagate on his behalf. It contains long prophecies, mostly concerned with 11th- to 13th-century history and contemporary politics relating to Italy and the Holy Land, some supposedly told by Merlin's ghost after his death, interspersed with episodes recounting Merlin's deeds and with assorted Arthurian adventures in which Merlin does not appear at all. The German Sagen von Merlin from the same era, which included the War of the Keys between Frederick and the Papacy, contains prophecies directed against the Popes. The widely circulated short political tract Expositio Abbatis Joachimi super Sibillis et Merlino (c. 1240), falsely attributed to Joachim of Fiore, contains the praise of Frederick's miraculous birth, which backfired, making it look like the coming of Antichrist.

During the 15th century, old Welsh works predicting the Celtic revenge and victory over the Saxons were recast as Merlin's (Myrddin's) prophecies and used along with Geoffrey by the propaganda of the Welsh-descended Henry VII of England (who fought under the red dragon banner) of the House of Tudor, which claimed to trace its lineage directly to Arthur. Later, the Tudors' Welsh supporters, including bards, interpreted the prophecy of King Arthur's return as having been fulfilled after the Tudors' ascent to the throne of England that they sought to legitimize following the Wars of the Roses. Prophecies attributed to Merlin have been also previously used by the 14th-century Welsh hero Owain Glyndŵr in his fight against the English rule. The vagueness of Merlin's prophecies enabled British monarchs and historians to continue using them even in the early modern period. Notably, the King of Scotland and later also of England and Ireland, James VI and I, claimed his 1603 unification of Britain into the United Kingdom had been foretold by Merlin.

=== Tales of Merlin's disappearance ===
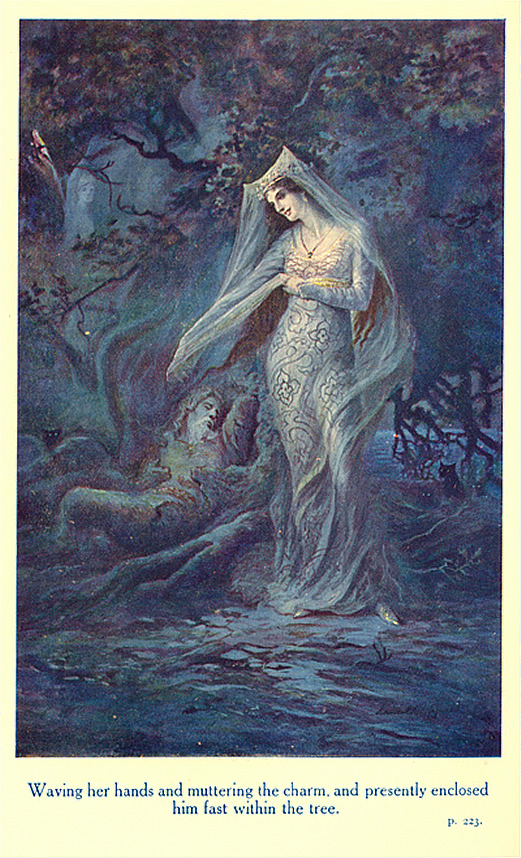
Lancelot Speed's illustration for James Thomas Knowles' The Legends of King Arthur and His Knights (1912):
"Waving her hands and uttering the charm, [she] presently enclosed him fast within the tree."

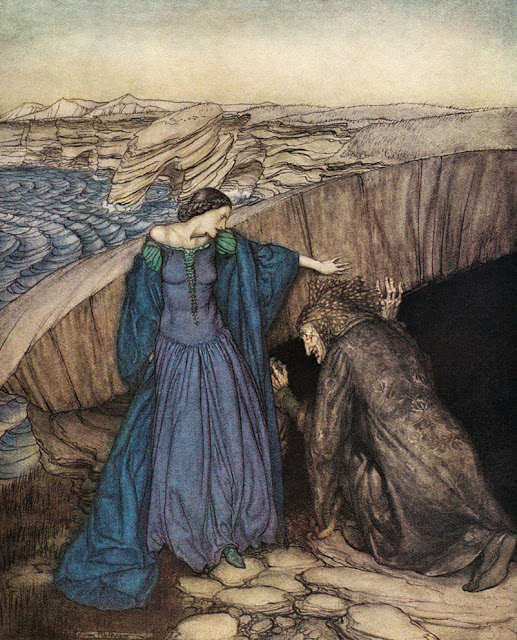
Arthur Rackham's illustration for Romance of King Arthur (1917) abridged from Le Morte d'Arthur by Alfred W. Pollard:
"How by her subtle working she made Merlin to go under the stone to let wit of the marvels there and she wrought so there for him that he came never out for all the craft he could do."

The Merlin stories often end with his removal from the world. In the prose romance tradition, Merlin's eventual undoing comes from his lusting after another of his female students: the one often named Viviane or Vivien, among various other names and spellings (including Malory's own Nyneve that his editor William Caxton changed to Nymue, which in turn eventually became the now-popular Nimue). The theme of Merlin's entrapment by a woman became one of the most popular and iconic in his legend. Her character and relation to Merlin have been added to the legend of Merlin in the prose continuations of de Boron's Merlin, identifying her with the figure of Lancelot's supernatural foster mother. She is also called a fairy (French fee), like Morgan, and is described as a Lady of the Lake, or the "chief Lady of the Lake" in the case of Malory's Nimue. In the Arthurian prequel Perceforest, the ancestry of both Merlin and the Lady of the Lake descends from the ancient fairy named Morgane (unrelated to Arthur's sister). Here, their bloodline had been cursed by Morgane (out of a false belief that her daughter was raped by her daughter's human lover), thus making her female descendant destined to kill a male one.

There are several versions of their story. Common themes in most of them include Merlin actually having the prior prophetic knowledge of her plot against him (one exception is the Spanish Post-Vulgate Baladro where his foresight ability is explicitly dampened by sexual desire) but lacking either ability or will to counteract it in any way, along with her using one of his own spells to get rid of him. Usually (including in Le Morte d'Arthur), having learned everything she could from him, Viviane will then replace the eliminated Merlin within the story, taking up his role as Arthur's adviser and court mage. However, Merlin's fate of either demise or eternal imprisonment, along with his destroyer or captor's motivation (from her fear of Merlin and protecting her own virginity, to her jealousy of his relationship with Morgan), is recounted differently in several variants of this motif. The form of his prison or grave can be variably a cave, a tree, or a hole, either within or under a large rock, or an invisible tower made of magic with no physical walls.

The scene is sometimes explicitly placed in the enchanted forest of Brocéliande, a legendary location today identified with the real-life Paimpont forest in Brittany. According to Le Morte d'Arthur, this happens somewhere in Benwick, the kingdom of Lancelot's father in Brittany. A Breton tradition cited by Roger Sherman Loomis in Celtic Myth and Arthurian Romance (where he also asserts that it "seems almost certain that Morgan le Fay and the Lady of the Lake were originally the same person" in the legend) has Merlin trapped by his mistress inside a tree on the Île de Sein.

Niniane, as the Lady of the Lake, student of Merlin is known in the Livre d'Artus continuation of Merlin, is mentioned as having broken his heart before his later second relationship with Morgan, but here the text does not tell how exactly Merlin vanished, other than relating his farewell meeting with Blaise. In the Vulgate Merlin, she (aged just 12 at the time) makes Merlin sleep forever in a pit in the forest of Darnantes, and that is where he remained, for never again did anyone see or hear of him or have news to tell of him." In the Post-Vulgate Suite de Merlin, the young King Bagdemagus (one of the early Knights of the Round Table) manages to find the rock under which Merlin is entombed alive by Niviene, as she is named there. (Note: In the Post-Vulgate Suite, Viviane (Niviene) is introduced as a young teenage princess. She is about to depart from Arthur's court following her initial episode, but, with some encouragement from Merlin, Arthur asks her to stay in his castle with the queen. During her stay, Merlin falls in love with her and desires her. Viviane, frightened that Merlin might take advantage of her with his spells, swears that she will never love him unless he swears to teach her all of his magic. Merlin consents, unaware that throughout the course of her lessons, Viviane will use Merlin's own powers against him, forcing him to do her bidding. When Viviane finally goes back to her country, Merlin escorts her. However, along the way, Merlin receives a vision that Arthur needs assistance. Viviane and Merlin rush back to Arthur's castle, but have to stop for the night in a stone chamber once inhabited by two lovers (a king's son, Anasteu, and a peasant woman in their forbidden affair). Merlin relates that when the lovers died, they were placed in a magic tomb within a room in the chamber. That night, while Merlin is asleep, Viviane, still disgusted with Merlin's desire for her, as well as his demonic heritage, casts a spell over him and places him in the magic tomb so that he can never escape, thus causing his slow death.) He does communicate with Merlin but is unable to lift the stone; what follows next is supposedly narrated in the mysterious text Conte del Brait (Tale of the Cry). (Note: The Conte referred to in the story is an unknown, supposedly separate text that might have been just fictitious. However, the Spanish Post-Vulgate manuscript known as the Baladro del sabio Merlin (The Shriek of the Sage Merlin), does describe what happened next. Merlin informs Bagdemagus that only Tristan could have opened the iron door sealing the cave in which Merlin is trapped, but Tristan is, by that time, still just a baby. Merlin then gives the story's eponymous great cry in a demonic voice, calling for his father to come and take him, and dies amidst a terrific supernatural event.) In the Prophéties de Merlin, his tomb is unsuccessfully searched for by various parties, including Morgan and her enchantresses, but cannot be accessed due to the deadly magic traps around it, while the Lady of the Lake comes to cruelly taunt Merlin, asking if he has rotted yet. She only allows Tristan's half-brother Meliadus the Younger (her lover, groomed by her from childhood) to access it and record Merlin's prophecies.

One notably alternate version that has a happier ending for Merlin is the Premiers Faits section of the Livre du Graal, where Niniane peacefully confines him in Brocéliande with walls of air, visible only as a mist to others but as a beautiful yet unbreakable crystal tower to him (only Merlin's disembodied voice can escape his prison one last time when he speaks to Gawain on the knight's quest to find him), where they then spend almost every night together as lovers. Besides evoking the final scenes from the Vita Merlini, this particular variant of their story also mirrors a certain episode type found in romances in two versions. There, depending on the variant, Merlin can be object of one-sided desire by a different amorous sorceress who (unsuccessfully) plots to trap him, or it is him who does trap an unwilling lover with his magic. (Note: In the Italian romance Tavola Ritonda, a fairy enchantress named Escorducarla, the mother of the evil Elergia, falls in love with Merlin and plans to trap him for herself in her purpose-built Palace of Great Desire, but Merlin foils this plot and banishes her to Avalon. Conversely, Gaucher de Dourdan's continuation of Perceval, the Story of the Grail has Merlin magically abduct a maiden who did not want to love him, then build a house for them to live in together.)

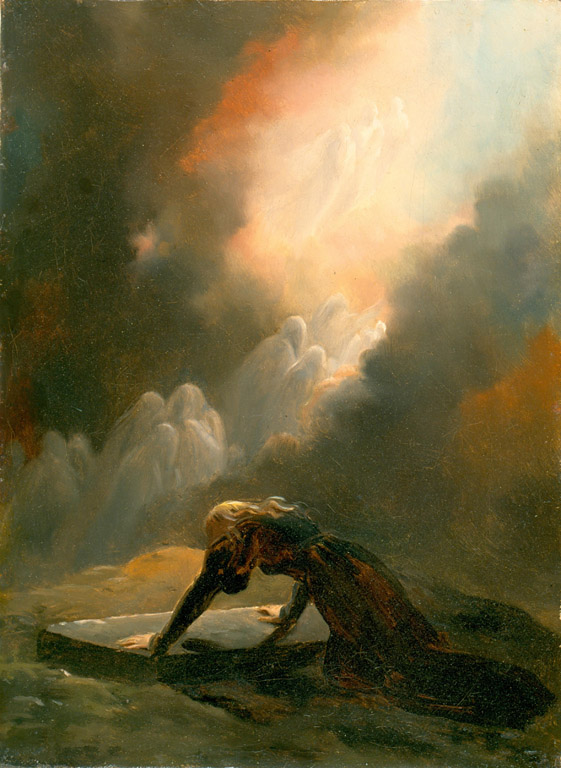
Bradamante at Merlin's Tomb by Alexandre-Évariste Fragonard (1820)

Unrelated to the legend of the Lady of the Lake, other purported sites of Merlin's burial include a cave deep inside Merlin's Hill (Welsh: Bryn Myrddin), outside Carmarthen. Carmarthen is also associated with Merlin more generally, including through the 13th-century manuscript known as the Black Book and the local lore of Merlin's Oak. In North Welsh tradition, Merlin retires to Bardsey Island (Welsh: Ynys Enlli), where he lives in a house of glass (Welsh: Tŷ Gwydr) with the Thirteen Treasures of the Island of Britain (Welsh: Tri Thlws ar Ddeg Ynys Prydain). One site of his tomb is said to be Marlborough Mound in Wiltshire, known in medieval times as Merlebergia (the Abbot of Cirencester wrote in 1215: "Merlin's tumulus gave you your name, Merlebergia").

Another site associated with Merlin's burial, in his 'Merlin Silvestris' aspect, is the confluence of the Pausalyl Burn and River Tweed in Drumelzier, Scotland. The 15th-century Scotichronicon tells that Merlin himself underwent a triple-death, at the hands of some shepherds of the under-king Meldred: stoned and beaten by the shepherds, he falls over a cliff and is impaled on a stake, his head falls forward into the water, and he drowns. (Note: Merlin is credited with predicting this: "Today I will perish, overwhelmed by stones and cudgels. / Today by body will be pierced through by a sharp stake / of wood, and so my life will expire. / Today I shall end my present life engulfed in the waves.") The fulfillment of another prophecy, ascribed to Thomas the Rhymer, came about when a spate of the Tweed and Pausayl occurred during the reign of the Scottish James VI and I on the English throne: "When Tweed and Pausayl meet at Merlin's grave, / Scotland and England one king shall have."

== Modern culture ==
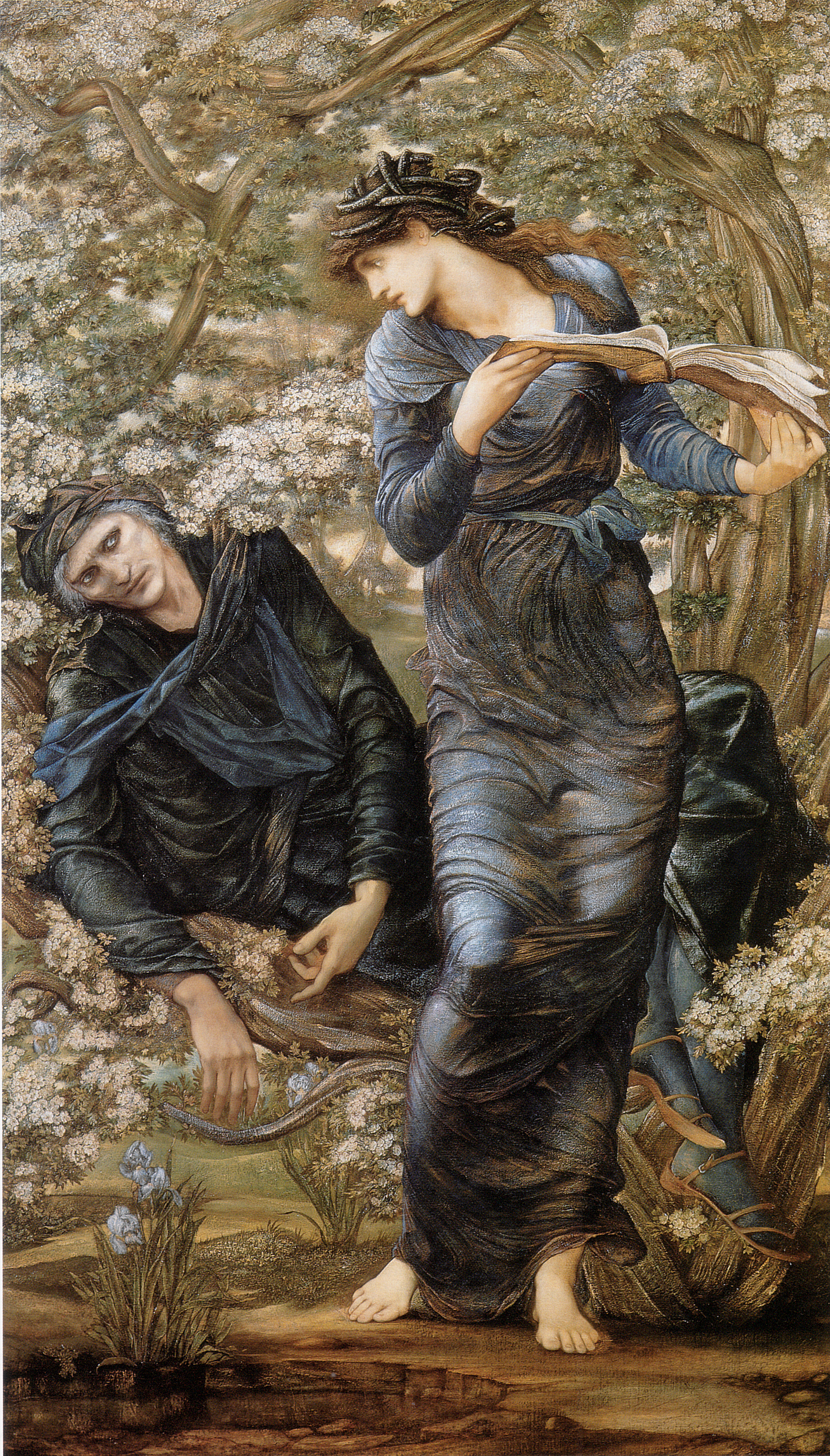
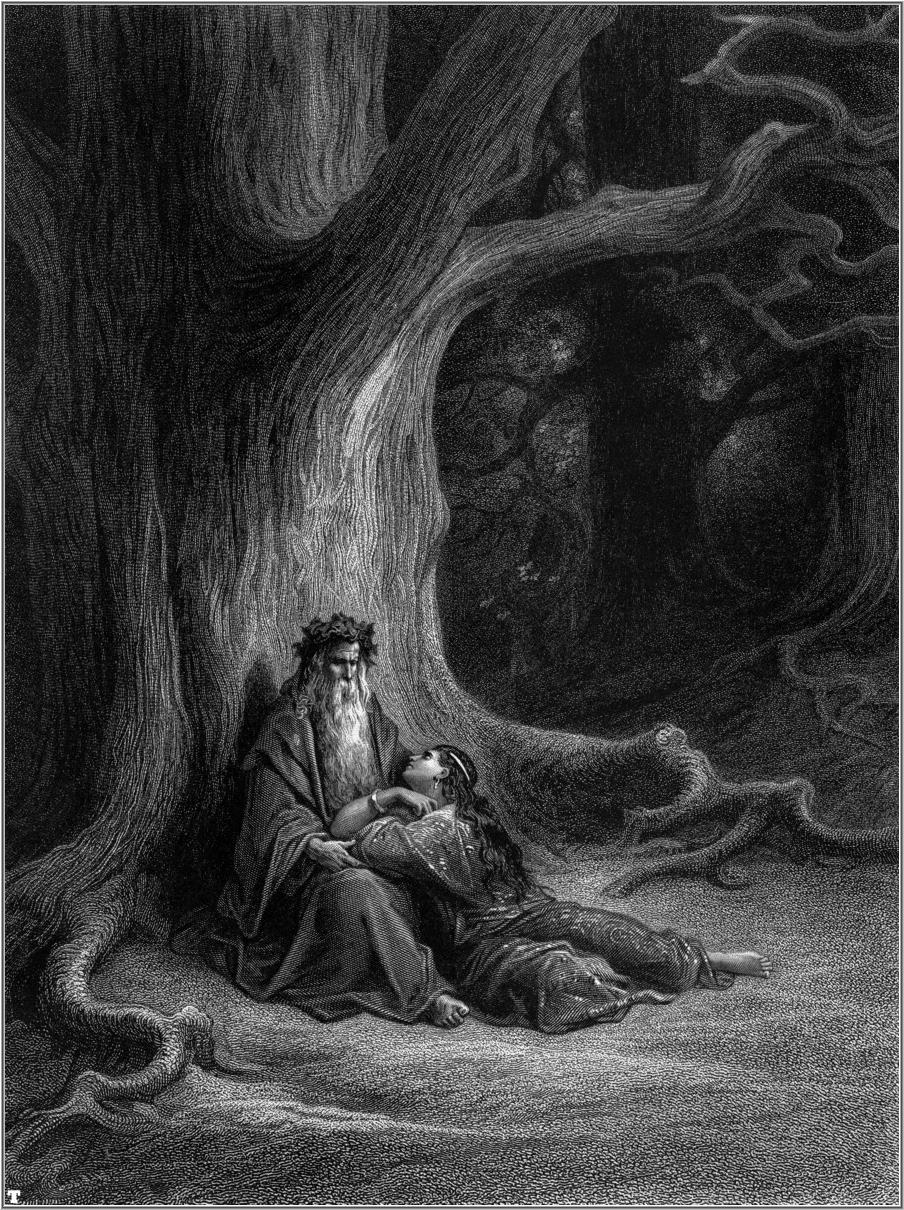
The Beguiling of Merlin by Edward Burne-Jones (1874) and Doré's 1868 plate illustrating the Tennyson's line: "At Merlin's feet the wily Vivien lay". The depicted episode in its various tellings became a major inspiration for Romantic authors and artists of the late 19th century. Merlin's Romantic image is often that of a somewhat naive old scholar, who succumbs to the charms of a femme fatale.

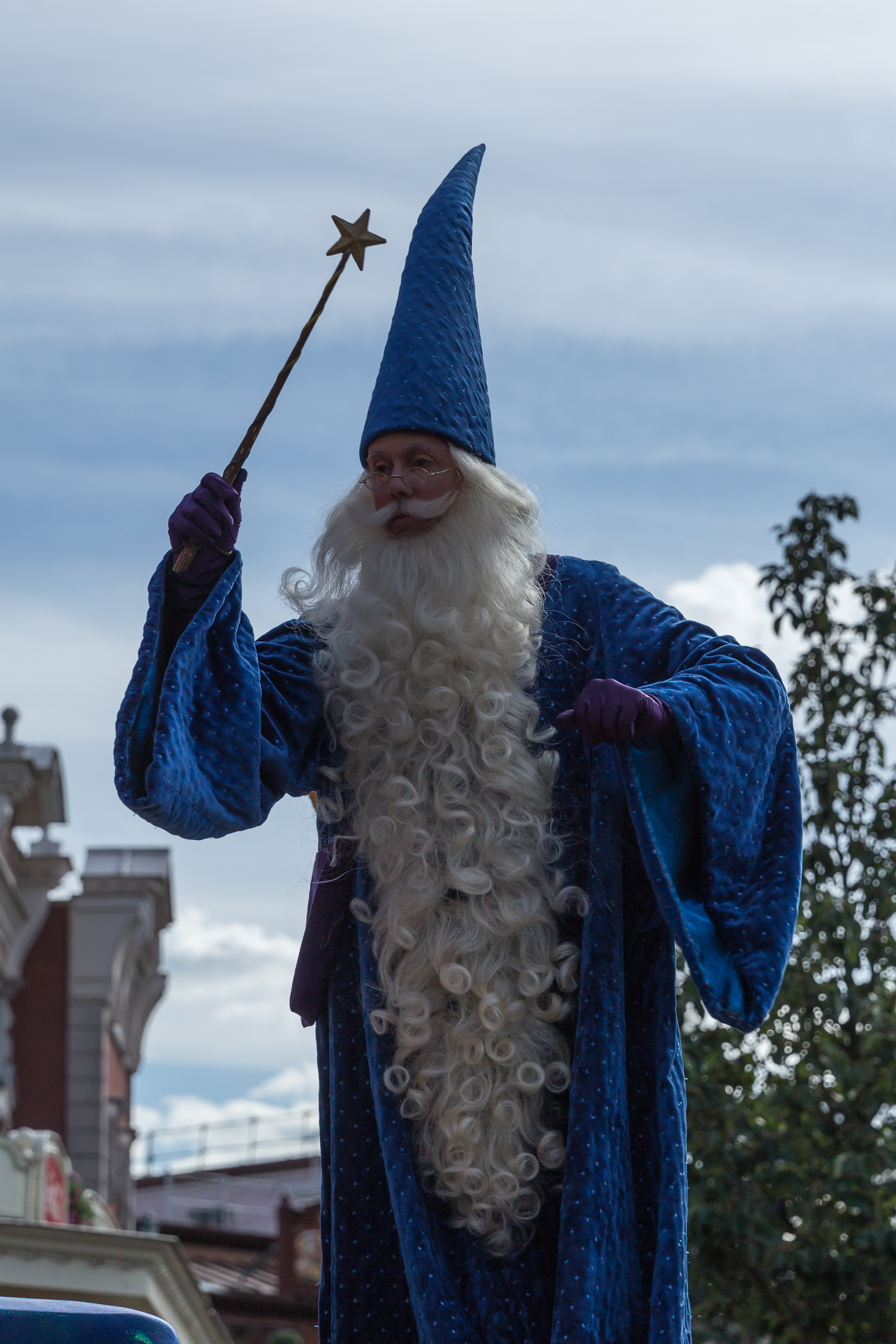
Merlin at Disneyland Paris (2015). T. H. White's 1938 novel The Sword in the Stone and its 1963 Disney adaptation fixed a popular imagination of Merlin as that of an old mentor figure using a magic wand and wearing a pointed hat and a robe decorated with astrological signs.

Merlin and stories about him have remained popular from the Renaissance to the present day, especially since the renewed interest in the legend of Arthur in modern times. During the French Renaissance, Merlin would continue to be a uniquely appealing figure of theater and ballet even after the interest in Arthur himself had already waned. In William Rowley's play The Birth of Merlin, or, The Child Hath Found his Father (1622), for instance, Merlin is a son of the Devil that becomes an adviser to Uther, the young King of Britain. Since the Romantic period, Merlin has been typically depicted as a wise old man with a long white beard, creating a modern wizard archetype reflected in many fantasy characters, such as J. R. R. Tolkien's Gandalf or J. K. Rowling's Dumbledore, who also use some of his other traits. As noted by Arthurian scholar Alan Lupack, "numerous novels, poems and plays center around Merlin. In American literature and popular culture, Merlin is perhaps the most frequently portrayed Arthurian character."

According to Stephen Thomas Knight, Merlin embodies a conflict between knowledge and power: beginning as a symbol of wisdom in the first Welsh stories, he became an advisor to kings in the Middle Ages, and eventually primarily a mentor and teacher to Arthur and others in the works around the world since the 19th century. While some modern authors write about Merlin positively through an explicitly Christian world-view, such as Stephen R. Lawhead in The Pendragon Cycle, some New Age movements instead see Merlin as a druid who accesses all the mysteries of the world. For instance, Merlin appears in the teachings of the Montana-based New Age religious-survivalist group Church Universal and Triumphant as one of their "ascended masters". Francophone works since the end of the 20th century have tended to avoid the Christian aspects of the character in favor of the pagan aspects and the tradition sylvestre (attributing positive values to one's links to forest and wild animals), thus "dechristianising" Merlin to present him as a champion for the idea of return to nature. Other authors may make Merlin obsessed with the quest for knowledge through astrology and alchemy, or highlight the duality of the character from a demonic father. Diverging from his traditional role in medieval romances, Merlin is also sometimes portrayed as a villain, as in Mark Twain's 1889 classic A Connecticut Yankee in King Arthur's Court. As Peter H. Goodrich wrote in Merlin: A Casebook:

Merlin's primary characteristics continue to be recalled, refined, and expanded today, continually encompassing new ideas and technologies as well as old ones. The ability of this complex figure to endure for more than fourteen centuries results not only from his manifold roles and their imaginative appeal, but also from significant, often irresolvable tensions or polarities [...] between beast and human (Wild Man), natural and supernatural (Wonder Child), physical and metaphysical (Poet), secular and sacred (Prophet), active and passive (Counselor), magic and science (Wizard), and male and female (Lover). Interwoven with these primary tensions are additional polarities that apply to all of Merlin's roles, such as those between madness and sanity, pagan and Christian, demonic and heavenly, mortality and immortality, and impotency and potency.

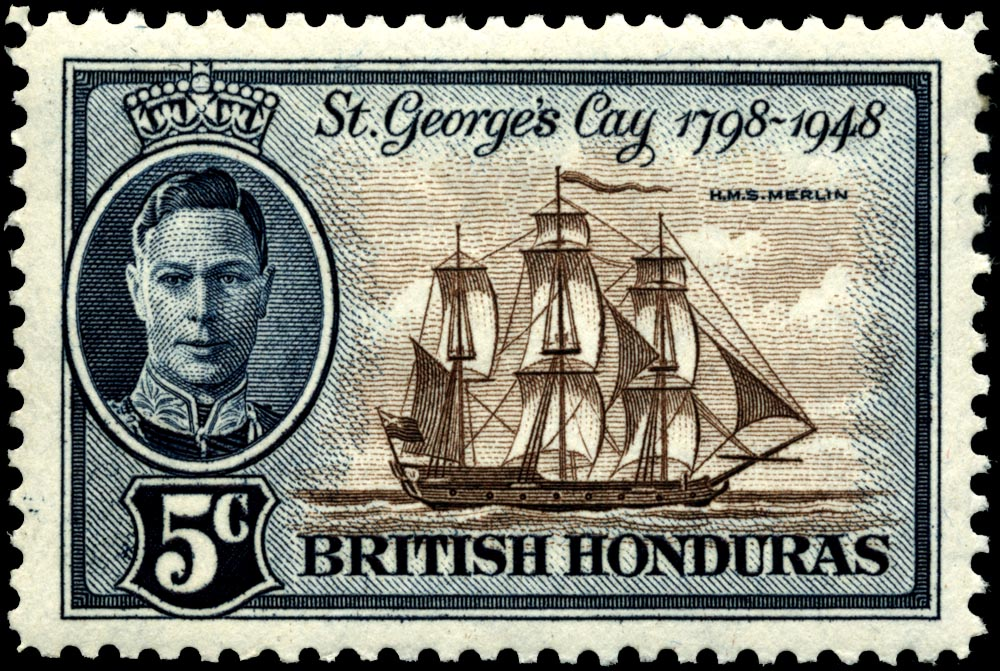
HMS Merlin (1796) on a 1948 stamp

Things named in honour of the legendary figure include asteroid 2598 Merlin, the company Merlin Entertainments, the handheld console Merlin, the literary magazine Merlin, the metal band Merlin, and more than a dozen different British warships each called HMS Merlin. Merlinia, the Ordovician trilobite, is also named after Merlin; the name is given in memory of a Welsh legend in which the broken tail parts of trilobites were identified as butterflies turned to stone by Merlin. The British-made Merlin helicopter has been in use by the armed forces of Britain, Denmark, Portugal, and others under the name Merlin instead of its original AgustaWestland AW101 designation.

He was one of eight British magical figures who were commemorated on a series of UK postage stamps issued by the Royal Mail in 2011, and one of the three Arthurian figures (along with Arthur and Morgan) commemorated on the gold and silver British pound coins issued by the Royal Mint in 2023. Universal Islands of Adventure used to have a medieval section called Merlinwood which held the Flying Unicorn and Dueling Dragons roller coasters and also featured the Enchanted Oak Tavern, a restaurant located inside a giant tree-stump with a face of Merlin on it; this area has since been demolished for The Wizarding World of Harry Potter and its attractions incorporated into the Harry Potter universe as Flight of the Hippogriff and Dragon Challenge. Merlin's Marvelous Miscellany, opened in 2022 as a tribute to Merlin's Magic Shop of the 1950s, is a souvenir shop in Fantasyland at Disneyland; several Disney Parks also feature The Sword in the Stone Ceremony hosted by Disney's Merlin from the 1963 animated film The Sword in the Stone.

Contrary to a popular belief among the Royal Air Force pilots and general society at the time (and also later), the Merlin engine that powered several types of British aircraft during the Second World War (including the famous Spitfire fighters that helped to win the Battle of Britain) was not named after the Arthurian legend figure, but after the bird, as dictated by the Rolls-Royce company naming policy. That coincidence nevertheless had a positive effect on British war morale.

== See also ==
- Garab Dorje, also said to have been conceived by a nun without a human father
- Merlin's Cave, a location under Tintagel Castle

== Bibliography ==
- Berthet, Jean-Charles; Walter, Philippe (1999). Le devin maudit: Merlin, Lailoken, Suibhne: Textes et étude. ELLUG. ISBN 978-2-84310-018-5. Archived from the original on 2024-04-04.
- Goodrich, Peter H.; Lacy, Norris J., eds. (2004). Merlin: A Casebook. Routledge. ISBN 978-1-135-58340-8.
- Knight, Stephen (2009). Merlin: Knowledge and Power Through the Ages. Cornell University Press. ISBN 978-0-8014-4365-7.
- Koberich, Nicolas (2008). Merlin, l'enchanteur romantique (in French). L'Harmattan. ISBN 978-2-296-06762-2.
- Koch, John T. (2006). Celtic Culture: A Historical Encyclopedia. ABC-CLIO. ISBN 978-1-85109-440-0.
- Walter, Philippe (2000). Merlin ou le savoir du monde (in French). Paris: Imago. ISBN 978-2-84310-018-5.
- Vadé, Yves (2008). Pour un tombeau de Merlin: du barde celte à la période moderne (in French). Corti. ISBN 978-2-7143-0966-2.
- Zumthor, Paul (2000). Merlin le prophète: un thème de la littérature polémique de l'historiographie et des romans (in French). Slatkine. ISBN 978-2-05-101817-3.
