= Mouldwarp =

Ancient dialect word for a mole

A mouldwarp is an ancient dialect word for a mole (Talpa europaea). Also, a mediaeval prophecy declared that the sixth King of England after King John would be the 'Mouldwarp', a proud, contemptible and cowardly person, having a skin like a goat.

== Prophecy ==
According to the first prophecy of the "Six Kings to Follow King John" (sometimes known as the Prophecy of Merlin), written about 1312, at the time of the birth of Edward III, the six kings could be likened to animals. The sixth king after John would be the Mouldwarp or Mole, who would be proud, contemptible and cowardly, having a skin like a goat. He would be attacked by a dragon, a wolf from the west and a lion from Ireland, who would drive him from the land, leaving him only an island in the sea, where he would pass his life in great sorrow and strife and die by drowning. The prophecy was the most popular prophecy of the 14th century and was used by the enemies of Henry IV and alluded to by Shakespeare in Henry IV, Part 1 (written before 1597).

The prophecy was again used during the disturbances leading to the Pilgrimage of Grace 1535–37 but this time was applied by the rebels to Henry VIII.

== Contemporary references ==
C. J. Sansom in his novel Sovereign, Hilary Mantel in her novel The Mirror & the Light and Philippa Gregory in her novel The Last Tudor each refer to Henry VIII being described as the 'Mouldwarp'.
