= Prophecy of Merlin =

Poem by John of Cornwall

Prophecy of Merlin (Prophetia Merlini), sometimes called The Prophecy of Ambrosius Merlin concerning the Seven Kings, is a 12th-century poem written in Latin hexameters by John of Cornwall, which he claimed was based or revived from a lost manuscript in the Cornish language. The original manuscript is unique and currently held in a codex at the Vatican Library.

== Synopsis ==
The text is an example of the popular prophetic writings attributed to the sage Merlin, which ascribe to the early bard prophecies relevant to the authors time. In this case the prophecies relate to the struggle between Stephen of Blois and the Empress Matilda, but the poem also contains local Cornish allusions of great interest.

== History ==
The translations were made sometime between 1141 and 1155, at the request of Robert Warelwast, Bishop of Exeter. John of Cornwall undertook to expound the prophecy of Merlin iuxta nostrum Britannicum. He produced a poem of 139 hexameters and prose commentary on the first 105 lines. Less than a third of the verse prophecies come directly from Prophetiae Merlini (c. 1136); the remainder presumably direct translations from Welsh or Cornish.

The manuscript attracted little attention from the scholarly world until 1876 when Whitley Stokes undertook a brief analysis of the Cornish and Welsh vocabulary found in John's marginal commentary. These notes are some of the earliest known writings in the Cornish language.

== See also ==
- Vita Merlini (The life of Merlin) by Geoffrey of Monmouth
- Merlin by Robert de Boron
- Mouldwarp
