= Esplumoir Merlin =

Place mentioned in the Arthurian legend

- Matter of Britain location
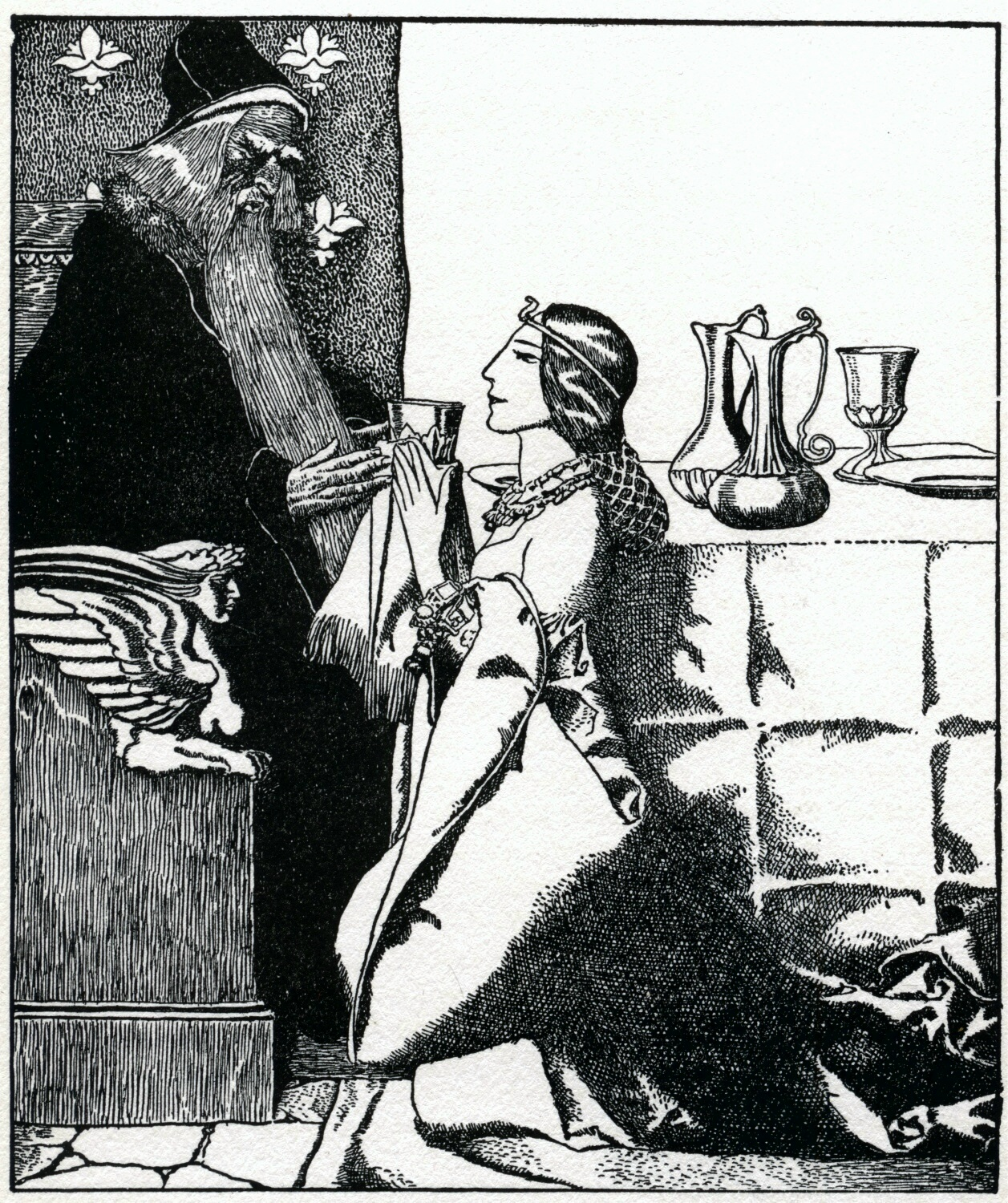
- The sorceress Viviane bewitches Merlin in a 1903 illustration by Howard Pyle.
- Genre: Chivalric romance

In-universe information
- Other name: Esplumöer
- Type: Rocky peak, castle, hut, or prison
- Characters: Merlin, Viviane, Gawain

The esplumoir Merlin is a place mentioned in the Arthurian legend in relation with the figure of Merlin. It notably appears in the Didot Perceval uncertainly attributed to Robert de Boron, and is also mentioned in Raoul de Houdenc's Meraugis de Portlesguez and Geoffrey of Monmouth's Vita Merlini. Its nature is uncertain, but it probably relates to a metamorphosis into a bird. It is presented as a hut, a tower or a high rock, and is sometimes likened to the Hotié de Viviane, a megalithic site in Brittany.

== Etymology ==
Etymologically, an esplumoir would be "a cage where a songbird is locked away at the time of moulting: a dark and warm place where the bird sings in its own feathers." However, the meaning of the word esplumoir as used in the romances remains unknown. It could be a word from Old French whose meaning has been lost through manuscript transmission.

Some scholars theorize that the name is derived from the Latin *ex-plumare to evoke the sense that Merlin is removing a bird disguise. Robert de Boron may have been drawing a comparison between the esplumoir and a falcon's mew, as he would likely have associated Merlin's name with that of the merlin, a European falcon (although there is no etymological relation between the two).

== Description ==
The esplumoir is thought to be the place where Merlin, who is fond of transforming himself into a bird, would resume his human form. According to the Didot Perceval, it is a cabin or a small house that Merlin built himself near the home of Perceval, guardian of the Grail, to prophesy. It is also imagined as a high tower or a rock, in other texts.

In Méraugis de Portlesguez, the esplumöer merlin is described as being atop a high cliff having no doors, windows or stairs and is inhabited by twelve prophetic maidens. In this version, Gawain is the one imprisoned in the esplumoir.

This place is mentioned by the poet Jacques Roubaud as being hot and dark, located at the top of "la roche grifaigne". Merlin, in the form of a bird, sings of the future there. Jacques Roubaud also explains the shadow that Perceval sees pass several times above him, accompanied by the voice of Merlin, by supposing the metamorphosis of the magician into a bird.

Geoffrey of Monmouth, in Vita Merlini, also describes a dwelling, built by Ganieda, that has seventy doors and seventy windows that allow Merlin to view the stars and make prophecies.
