= John of Cornwall (grammarian) =

English educator and grammarian

John of Cornwall, possibly called in Latin Johannes Cornubiensis or Johannes de Sancto Germano was a 14th-century scholar and teacher, author of the English grammar Speculum Grammaticale

He is not to be confused with the twelfth-century theologian John of Cornwall who authored the Eulogium ad Alexandrum Papam III. There was also a Benedictine monk John of St. Germans who wrote a Commentarius in Aristotelis libros duo analyticorum posteriorum (now at the Magdalen College, Oxford); it is not clear whether these were the same person.

It has been claimed as one of the great ironies of history that three Cornish-speaking Cornishmen brought the English language back from the verge of extinction - John of Cornwall, John Trevisa and Richard Pencrych.
