= List of Latin phrases (B) =

This page is one of a series listing English translations of notable Latin phrases, such as veni, vidi, vici and et cetera. Some of the phrases are themselves translations of Greek phrases, as ancient Greek rhetoric and literature started centuries before the beginning of Latin literature in ancient Rome.

| Latin | Translation | Notes |
|---|---|---|
| barba crescit caput nescit | beard grows, head doesn't grow wiser | |
| barba non facit philosophum | a beard doesn't make one a philosopher | Wise only in appearance. From Aulus Gellius' Attic Nights |
| barba tenus sapientes | wise as far as the beard | Wise only in appearance. From Erasmus's collection of Adages. |
| Beata Virgo Maria (BVM) | Blessed Virgin Mary | A common name in the Roman Catholic Church for Mary, the mother of Jesus. The genitive, Beatae Mariae Virginis (BMV), occurs often as well, appearing with such words as horae (hours), litaniae (litanies) and officium (office), and with some monasteries and secondary schools for girls. |
| beatae memoriae | of blessed memory | See in memoriam |
| beati pauperes spiritu | blessed in spirit [are] the poor. | A Beatitude from Matthew 5:3 in the Vulgate: beati pauperes spiritu, quoniam ipsorum est regnum caelorum "Blessed in spirit [are] the poor, for theirs is the kingdom of the heavens". |
| beati possidentes | blessed [are] those who possess | Translated from Euripides |
| beati qui ambulant lege domini | blessed are they who walk in the law of the Lord | Inscription above the entrance to St. Andrew's Church (New York City), based on the second half of Psalm 119:1 |
| beati quorum via integra est | blessed are they whose way is upright | first half of Psalm 119:1, base of several musical setting such as the motet Beati quorum via by Charles Villiers Stanford |
| beatus homo qui invenit sapientiam | blessed is the man who finds wisdom | From Proverbs 3:13; set to music in a 1577 motet of the same name by Orlando di Lasso. |
| bella gerant alii Protesilaus amet! | let others wage war Protesilaus should love! | Originally from Ovid, Heroides 13.84, where Laodamia is writing to her husband Protesilaus who is at the Trojan War. She begs him to stay out of danger, but he was in fact the first Greek to die at Troy. Also used of the Habsburg marriages of 1477 and 1496, written as bella gerant alii, tu felix Austria nube (let others wage war; you, happy Austria, marry). Said by King Matthias. |
| bella detesta matribus | war hateful to mothers | From Horace |
| bello et jure senesco | I grow old through war and law | Motto of the House of d'Udekem d'Acoz |
| bellum autem ita suscipiatur, ut nihil aliud nisi pax quaesita videatur | war should be made with no other view than the attainment of peace | Cicero, De Officiis I, 80 |
| bellum omnium contra omnes | war of all against all | A phrase used by Thomas Hobbes to describe the state of nature |
| bellum Romanum | war as the Romans did it | All-out war without restraint as Romans practiced against groups they considered to be barbarians |
| bellum se ipsum alet | war feeds itself | |
| Biblia pauperum | Paupers' Bible | Tradition of biblical pictures displaying the essential facts of Christian salvation |
| bibo ergo sum | I drink, therefore I am | A play on "cogito ergo sum", "I think therefore I am" |
| bis dat qui cito dat | he gives twice, who gives promptly | A gift given without hesitation is as good as two gifts. |
| bis in die (bid) | twice in a day | Medical shorthand for "twice a day" |
| bona fide | in good faith | "well-intentioned", "fairly". In modern contexts, often has connotations of "genuinely" or "sincerely". Bona fides is not the plural (which would be bonis fidebus), but the nominative, and means simply "good faith". Opposite of mala fide. |
| bona notabilia | note-worthy goods | In law, if a person dying has goods, or good debts, in another diocese or jurisdiction within that province, besides his goods in the diocese where he dies, amounting to a certain minimum value, he is said to have bona notabilia; in which case, the probat of his will belongs to the archbishop of that province. |
| bona officia | good services | A nation's offer to mediate in disputes between two other nations |
| bona patria | goods of a country | A jury or assize of countrymen, or good neighbors |
| bona vacantia | vacant goods | United Kingdom legal term for ownerless property that passes to The Crown |
| boni pastoris est tondere pecus non deglubere | it is a good shepherd's [job] to shear his flock, not to flay them | Tiberius reportedly said this to his regional commanders, as a warning against taxing the populace excessively. |
| bono malum superate | overcome evil with good | Motto of Westonbirt School |
| bonum commune communitatis | common good of the community | Or "general welfare". Refers to what benefits a society, as opposed to bonum commune hominis, which refers to what is good for an individual. In the film Hot Fuzz, this phrase is chanted by an assembled group of people, in which context it is deliberately similar to another phrase that is repeated throughout the film, which is The Greater Good. |
| bonum commune hominis | common good of a man | Refers to an individual's happiness, which is not "common" in that it serves everyone, but in that individuals tend to be able to find happiness in similar things. |
| boreas domus, mare amicus | the North is our home, the sea is our friend | Motto of Orkney |
| brutum fulmen | harmless (or inert) thunderbolt | Used to indicate either an empty threat, or a judgement at law which has no practical effect |
| busillis | baffling puzzle, thorny problem | John of Cornwall (ca. 1170) was once asked by a scribe what the word meant. It turns out that the original text said in diebus illis [in those days], which the scribe misread as in die busillis [at the day of Busillis], believing this was a famous man. This mondegreen has since entered the literature; it occurs in Alessandro Manzoni's novel The Betrothed (1827), in Dostoevsky's The Brothers Karamazov (1880), and in Andrea Camilleri's Inspector Montalbano series. |
