= John of Cornwall (theologian) =

Cornish theologian

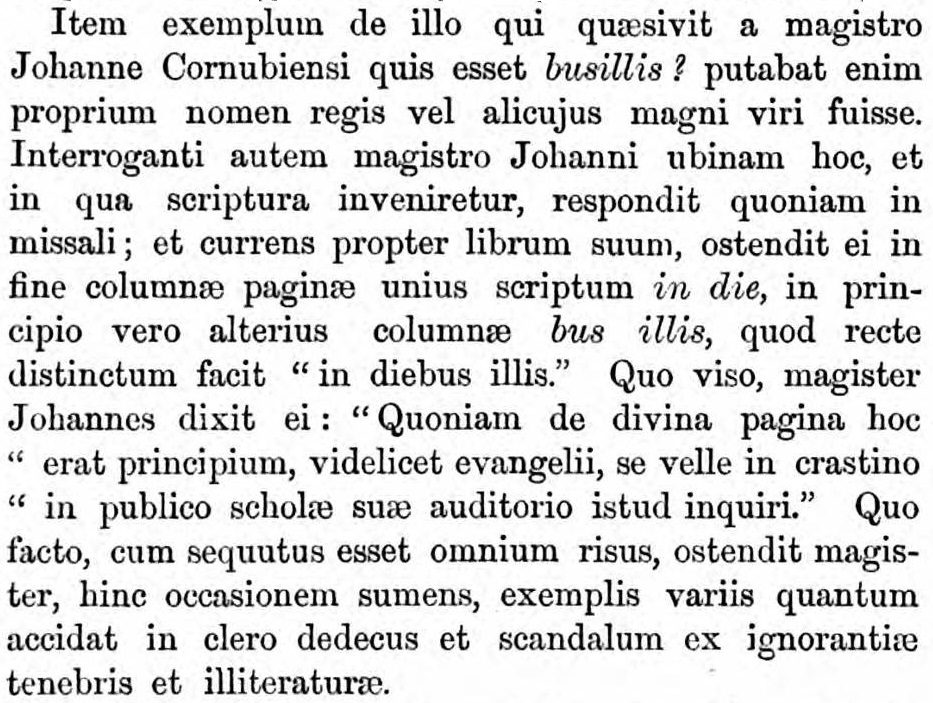
Gerald of Wales' report of John of Cornwall's mockery about a scholar reading in die busillis instead of in diebus illis: Another example (of the illatinity of contemporary clergy) is the scholar who asked his master John of Cornwall: Who was Busillis? He thought it was the name of a king or another great man. When John asked him in which book he had found the expression, the scholar answered: in the missal. And fetching the book, he showed his master at the end of one column the words in die and at the beginning of the next the word busillis - which, correctly grouped, makes in diebus illis. Master John, seeing that, said to him: "Considering that the word originates from a holy page, that is from the gospel, I will inquire it tomorrow with the audience in my public lesson." The master did so, and answered by the laughter of all, he took the occasion to show by more examples what shame and scandal was brought over the clergy by their dark ignorance and illiterateness.

John of Cornwall, in Latin Johannes Cornubiensis or Johannes de Sancto Germano was a Christian scholar and teacher, who was living in Paris about 1176.

He is not to be confused with the fourteenth-century John of Cornwall who expounded Latin at his grammar school in English instead of French. There was also an archdeacon of Worcester called John of Cornwall around 1197, who probably was a different person.

== Life and writings ==
Little is known of his life. From his names, it is surmised that he was a native of St Germans in Cornwall. He studied with Peter Lombard in Paris, and wrote Eulogium ad Alexandrum Papam III, quod Christus sit aliquis homo, a treatise refuting Abelard's doctrine that the humanity of Jesus was only a garment clothing the Logos.

The Eulogium (dated 1176 or later) was printed by Edmond Martène in Thesaurus novus anecdotum (Paris, 1717), and by Jacques Paul Migne's in Patrologiae Latinae Cursus Completus (1844–1855), vol. CXCIX. Other books attributed to him are:

- Apologia de Christi Incarnatione (disputed authorship; perhaps by Hugh of St. Victor).
- Summa qualiter fiat Sacramentum Altaris per virtutem sanctae crucis et de septem canonibus vel ordinibus Missae. Migne, Patrologiae Latinae, vol. CLXXVII.
- Prophetia Merlini or Merlini prophetia cum expositione. A poem written between 1141 and 1155, known from a unique manuscript in the Vatican Library.
- De diuersa consuetudine legendi Sacram Scripturam. See Friedrich Stegmüller, Bibl. 4419; Richard Sharpe, Latin Writers, 229.

== See also ==
- Busillis in the List of Latin phrases.
- An dhargan a Verdhin / The prophecy of Merlin, translated by Julyan Holmes. 2nd ed., Kesva an Taves Kernewek / The Cornish Language Board, Gwinear, 2001. ISBN 1-902917-19-7. (full parallel English/Cornish text).
