= Randerson =

Randerson is a name or surname, and may refer to:

- Glenda Randerson (born 1949), New Zealand painter
- Jenny Randerson (1948–2025), Welsh Liberal Democrat member of the House of Lords
- Richard Randerson (born 1940), Dean of Holy Trinity Cathedral, Auckland
- Tony Randerson (born 1949), New Zealand Chief High Court Judge
- Randerson (footballer) (born 2004), Brazilian footballer
