= Glenda (given name) =

- Pronunciation: /ˈɡlɛndə/
- Gender: Feminine
- Language: English

Origin
- Origin: possibly from Welsh / Irish language/gaelic glân / glan = "pure, clean" + da = "good"

Other names
- Related names: Glenn (sometimes feminized to Glenna; associated by sound)

Glenda (from Welsh glân 'pure, clean, holy' and da 'good') is a feminine given name.

== People ==
Notable people with the name include:

- Glenda (musician), Glenda López Exposito (born 1988), Cuban singer, songwriter, and flute player
- Glenda Adams (1939–2007), Australian author
- Glenda Collins (born 1943), English pop singer
- Glenda Dickerson (1945–2012), American theatre director
- Glenda Farrell (1904–1971), American actress
- Glenda Gilmore (born 1949), American historian of the Southern United States
- Glenda Goertzen (born 1967), Canadian author
- Glenda Hatchett (born 1951), American television jurist known as "Judge Hatchett"
- Glenda Hood (born 1950), American politician
- Glenda Jackson (1936–2023), English actress and politician
- Glenda Linscott (born 1958), Australian actress
- Glenda Morean-Phillip, Trinidad and Tobago politician
- Glenda Price (born 1939), American educator and former president of Marygrove College
- Glenda Randerson (born 1949), New Zealand painter

== Fictional Characters ==
- Glenda Slagg, fictional columnist in Private Eye

== See also ==
- Glinda
- Glenys
- Glendora (feminization of Glendower)
- Gwenda (given name)
