= Glenda =

Glenda may refer to:

- Glenda (given name)
- Glenda (musician) (born 1988), Cuban singer, songwriter, and flute player
- Glenda, the Plan 9 Bunny, mascot of Plan 9 from Bell Labs
- Tropical Storm Glenda, various storms, including hurricanes and cyclones named Glenda

== See also ==
- Glen or Glenda, a film by Ed Wood
- Glinda the Good Witch, character from Oz books and related media
