= Glendora =

Glendora may refer to:

== Places ==
- Glendora, California, an American city near Los Angeles
  - Glendora Curve, an American road interchange between State Route 57 and the Foothill Freeway in California
  - Glendora High School, in Glendora, Los Angeles County, California, United States
  - Glendora Historical Society, a nonprofit organization founded in 1947 dedicated to preserving and interpreting the history of Glendora, California, and the Upper San Gabriel Valley.
  - Glendora station, a light rail station in the Los Angeles Metro Rail system.
- Glendora, Michigan, an American community in Weesaw Township, Berrien County
- Glendora, Mississippi, an American village in Tallahatchie County
- Glendora, New Jersey, an American community in Gloucester Township, Camden County

== Other uses ==
- "Glendora" (song), a 1956 song by Perry Como
- Glendora Review, a Nigerian magazine that publishes work relating to art, literature, and culture

== See also ==
- Glenda (given name)
