= Gabreil Daveis Tavern House =

Historic house in New Jersey, United States

- Hillman Hospital House
- U.S. National Register of Historic Places
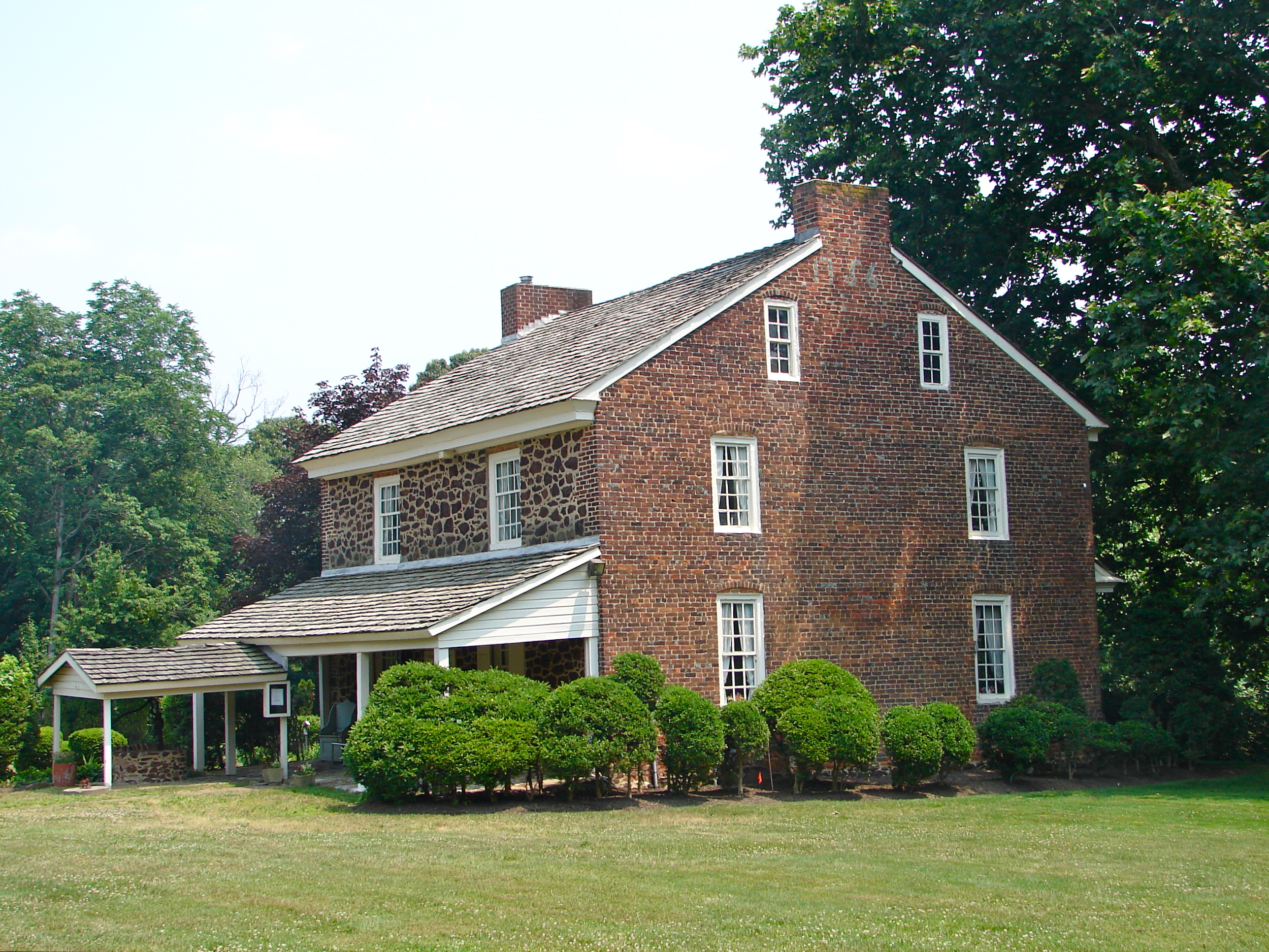

- Location within Camden County, New Jersey Location within New Jersey Location within the United States
- Location: Glendora, New Jersey
- Coordinates: 39.837424°N 75.060792°W
- Built: 1756
- NRHP reference No.: 77000858
- Added to NRHP: July 14, 1977

The Gabreil Daveis Tavern House, also known as the Hillman Hospital House, is a historic building in the Glendora section of Gloucester Township, Camden County, New Jersey, United States. This tavern was built in 1756 near the Big Timber Creek and housed boatmen who used the creek to ship goods to Philadelphia. It was designated a hospital by George Washington during the Revolutionary War.

Since its restoration, it has been the focal point of the township's history. It was listed in the New Jersey Department of Environmental Protection's Historic Preservation Office in 1973 (ID# 958), and the National Register of Historic Places in 1977 (NR reference #: 77000858).

== See also ==
- New Jersey in the American Revolution
- National Register of Historic Places listings in Camden County, New Jersey
- List of the oldest buildings in New Jersey
