= Chew–Powell House =

Historic house in New Jersey, United States

- U.S. National Register of Historic Places
- New Jersey Register of Historic Places
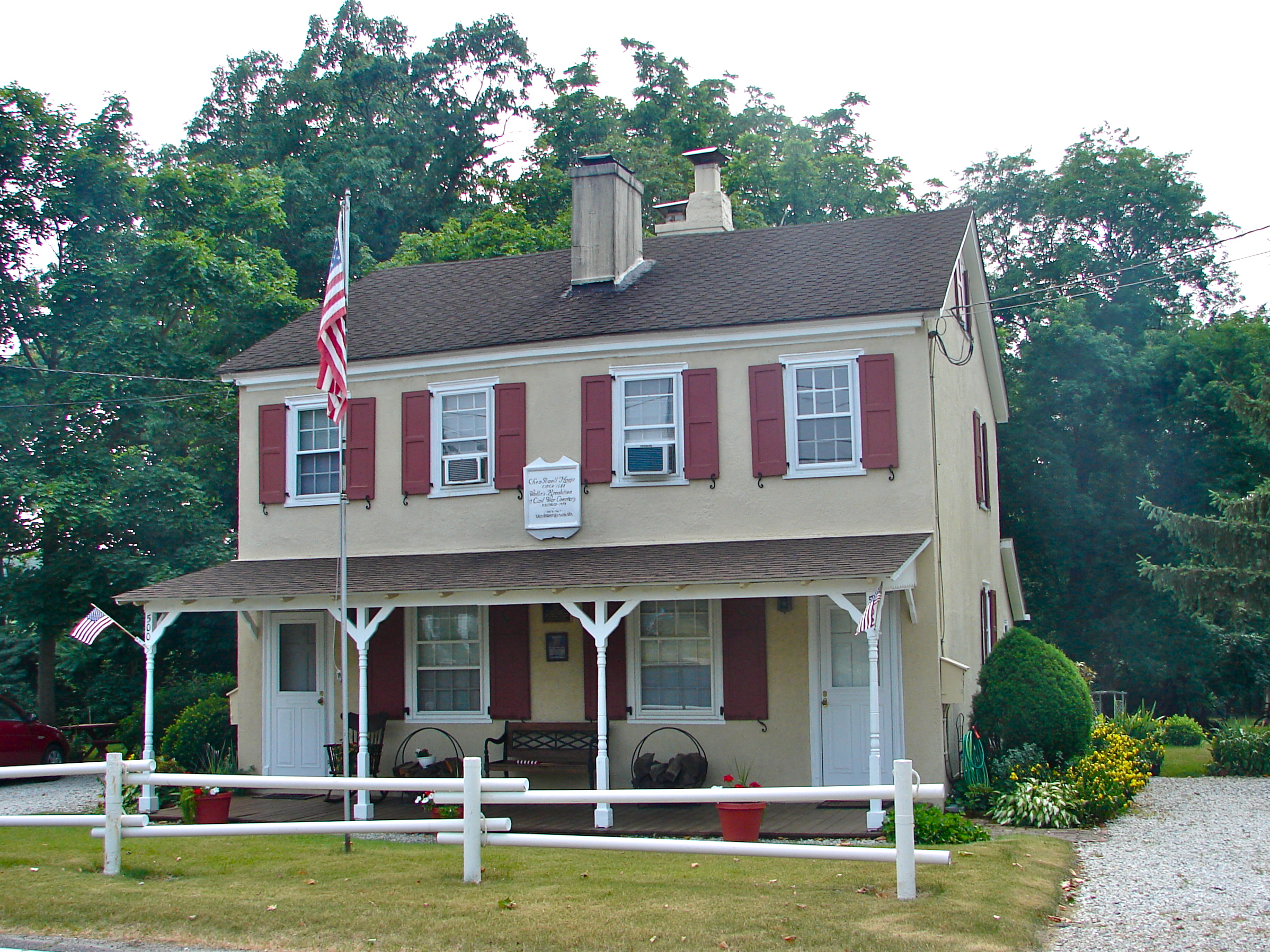
- Chew-Powell House in the Blenheim section of Gloucester Township in June 2011

- Location within Camden County, New Jersey Location within New Jersey Location within the United States
- Location: 500–502 Good Intent Road, Gloucester Township, New Jersey
- Coordinates: 39.806288°N 75.075783°W
- NRHP reference No.: 75001127
- NJRHP No.: 957

Significant dates
- Added to NRHP: March 27, 1975
- Designated NJRHP: December 9, 1974

The Chew–Powell House is located at 500–502 Good Intent Road in the Blenheim section of Gloucester Township in Camden County, New Jersey, United States. The historic house was built in 1688 by James Whitall. The Chew–Powell–Wallens Burying Ground, next to the house, is considered to be the oldest cemetery in the township, and it reportedly contains the remains of early settlers, soldiers of the Revolutionary and Civil Wars and Leni Lenape Native Americans.

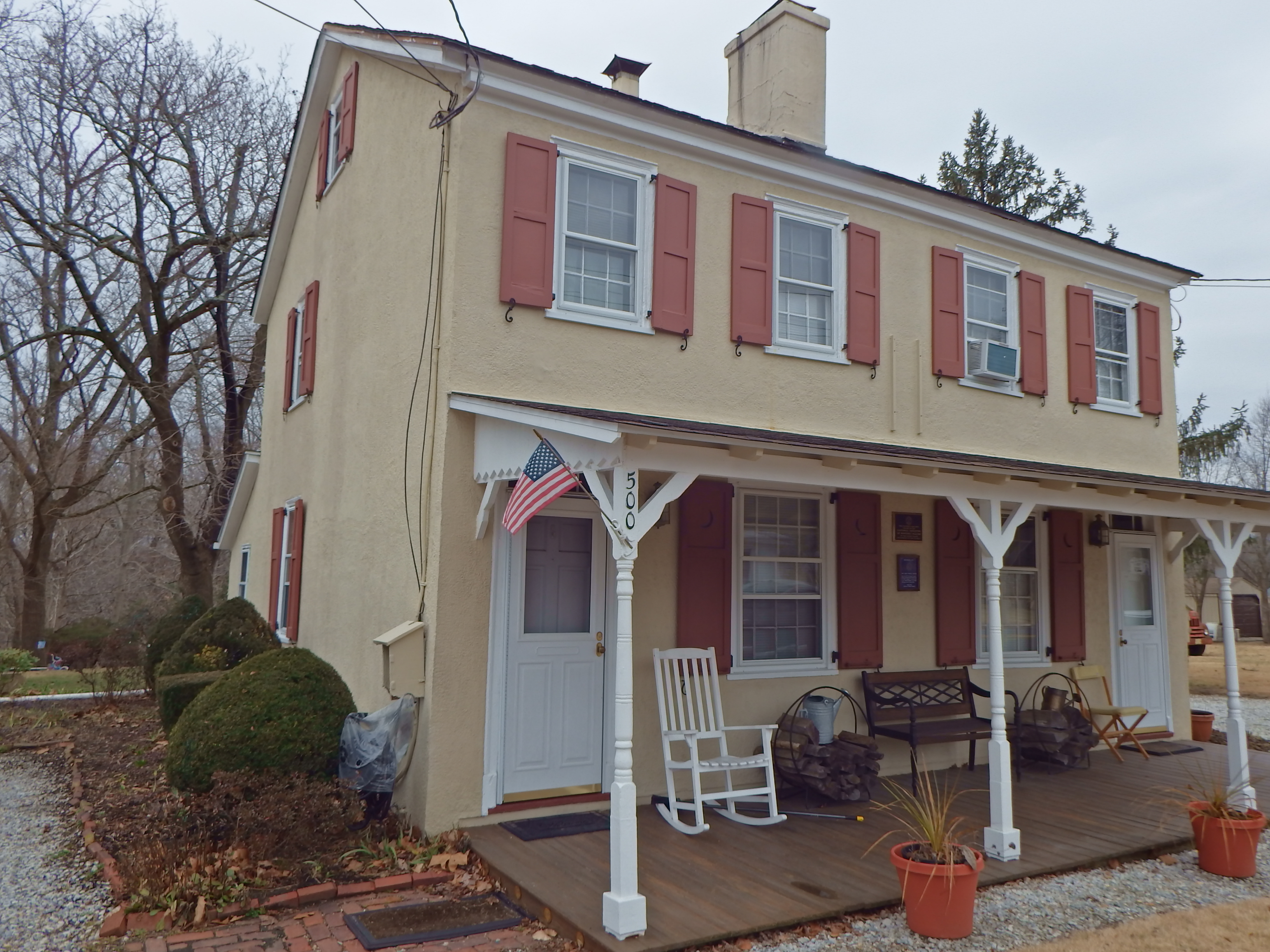
500-502 Good Intent Road, Gloucester Township

The structure was once well-preserved but now sits in disarray, is privately owned and maintained, currently serves as a private residence. It was listed in the New Jersey Department of Environmental Protection's Historic Preservation Office in 1974, and the National Register of Historic Places three months later on March 27, 1975, for its significance in military history.

== See also ==
- List of the oldest buildings in New Jersey
- National Register of Historic Places listings in Camden County, New Jersey
