= Slagg =

Slagg is a surname. Notable people with the surname include:

- John Slagg (1837–1889), British businessman and politician
- Stanley Slagg (1903–1978), American lawyer and politician

== Other ==
- Glenda Slagg, fictional columnist in the magazine Private Eye
