= Gloucester, New Jersey =

Gloucester, New Jersey may refer to:

- Gloucester City, New Jersey, Camden County
- Gloucester Township, New Jersey, Camden County
- Gloucester County, New Jersey
