= Our Lady of Hope Regional School =

Catholic school in Blackwood, New Jersey, US

- Official school logo

Location
- 420 South Black Horse Pike; Gloucester Township, Camden County, New Jersey 08012; United States; 39.79415°N 75.06374°W

Information
- Religious affiliation: Roman Catholic
- Denomination: Diocese of Camden
- Established: 2008
- Founder: Diocese of Camden
- Oversight: Diocese of Camden
- NCES School ID: A1902830
- Principal: Elizabeth Martino
- Faculty: 22.9 FTEs
- Grades: Pre-K3–8
- Enrollment: 335 (plus 45 in PreK, as of 2023–24)
- Student to teacher ratio: 14.6:1
- Campus type: Suburban
- Color: Navy Gold Black
- Mascot: Lion
- Accreditation: Middle States Association (MSA-CESS)
- Tuition: Catholic: 1st Child: $6,150; 2nd Child: $5,000; 3rd Child Onward: $4,000. Non-catholic/other faith: Each child: $7,175.
- Website: ourladyofhopecatholicschool.org

Our Lady of Hope Regional School informly known as OLOH or just as Hope is a private Catholic school serving students from Pre-Kindergarten (age 3) through eighth grade. Located in the Blackwood section of Gloucester Township, New Jersey, it operates under the auspices of the Roman Catholic Diocese of Camden and was established in 2008 as a result of merging the former Saint Agnes School and Saint Jude Regional School in Blackwood. It is supported by several local parishes (Our Lady of Hope Parish at St. Agnes Church, St. Charles Borromeo, Holy Family, and Saints Peter and Paul) and emphasizes Catholic faith, service, and community in its mission. The curriculum follows diocesan guidelines and New Jersey Core Curriculum Standards.

The school is accredited by the Middle States Association of Colleges and Schools (valid through 2025) and is a member of the National Catholic Educational Association.

As of the 2023–24 school year, the school had an enrollment of 335 students (plus 45 in PreK) and 22.9 classroom teachers (on an FTE basis), for a student–teacher ratio of 14.6:1.

== History ==
Our Lady of Hope Regional School opened for the 2008–09 school year, following the consolidation of St. Agnes School and St. Jude Regional School in Blackwood. This merger was part of a broader diocesan reorganization: the two Blackwood parishes themselves united in 2010 to form Our Lady of Hope Parish. The new school combined the resources and traditions of its predecessors, aiming to serve the Catholic families of Gloucester Township and neighboring areas. Sister Paula Randow, a member of the Sisters of St. Francis of Philadelphia, had been principal of St. Jude’s School and continued as founding principal of the merged school for many years (she retired in 2018).

In March 2019, a fire broke out at the school. The fire occurred shortly before 8 a.m., when classes had been canceled due to a snowstorm, and no students were present. Smoke was reported coming from the roof, and firefighters brought the blaze under control within approximately 45 minutes. The fire caused significant damage to classrooms in the "specials wing", used for art, library, science, and computer lab instruction. The Gloucester Township Fire Marshal suspected an electrical short in the attic as the cause. The affected areas were temporarily closed while repairs were made, and classes resumed once restoration was completed. In recent years, the school has expanded its early childhood offerings: in 2023 it received a $12,000 diocesan grant that funded the addition of a third Pre-K4 classroom, raising its pre-school capacity and contributing to a surge in enrollment.

== Academics ==
Our Lady of Hope delivers a diverse elementary and middle school curriculum with a strong Catholic focus. Core subjects include language arts, mathematics, science, social studies, and religion, following diocesan guidelines and New Jersey State Core Standards. The school emphasizes balanced intellectual, spiritual, physical, and social development. The pre-kindergarten program (Pre-K3 and Pre-K4) focuses on early math, literacy, and motor skills through music, art, and play. Full-day kindergarten is offered, followed by grades 1–8. All students participate in religion classes and campus ministries, reinforcing the Catholic mission. Visual arts, music, and physical education are included at all grade levels. Students routinely exceed diocesan average scores on standardized tests.

== Athletics ==
The school fields athletic teams called the Lions, competing in the Catholic Youth Organization (CYO) and local leagues. Sports include baseball (boys), basketball (boys and girls), cheerleading, cross country, soccer, softball (girls), track & field, and volleyball. The lion mascot does not appear during games.

== Accreditation and associations ==
Our Lady of Hope is accredited by the Middle States Association of Colleges and Schools through 2025 and is a member of the National Catholic Educational Association (NCEA).
