= London Student =

University of London student newspaper

- Type: Student newspaper
- Format: Berliner
- Owner: Independent cooperative
- Founded: 1979
- Language: English
- Relaunched: January 5, 2015
- Website: londonstudent.coop

London Student is a student paper, originally the official student newspaper of the University of London Union. It began publishing in 1979 (replacing its predecessor Sennet, including a redesign) and was at one point the largest student-run newspaper in Europe (representing over 120,000 students). At that time it was published weekly in term-time and printed in Gloucestershire, before being distributed to around 50 London sites including non-university further and higher education establishments, such as Polytechnics, overnight. It was financed by a combination of university grant and advertising. The editor was elected annually by other student journalists who had worked on the paper as a sabbatical from studies, and there was one staff member, a business manager and advertising sales person. The paper stopped publishing in 2014 after the University of London withdrew funding, but relaunched itself online the following year under a new editorial team. It is now an independent publication with ultimate control over content and appointments vested in the editorial team as a worker co-operative.

Until its closure in 2014, London Student distributed 12,500 copies fortnightly during termtime throughout the university year, equating to approximately 12 issues annually. This once made it the largest student newspaper in Europe.

A campaign to save it was led by the paper's last editor, Oscar Webb, including an open letter to the University of London signed by journalists Amol Rajan, Anita Annand, Laurie Penny and the academic David Graeber, among others, London Student closed in July 2014 after funding from the university was withdrawn.

It was relaunched as a co-operative not affiliated to the University of London in January 2015, and is now published online. The most recent print edition was a single issue published 1 October 2015. Following its relaunch, London Student won Best Newcomer at the 2016 Student Publication Association (SPA) Awards. London Student won Best Website at the 2017 SPA Awards and was Highly Commended for Best Use of Digital Media.

== Notable stories ==
In March 2006, the newspaper broke the story that The Mail on Sunday newspaper had offered student reporters money to infiltrate and record meetings of student Islamic societies in the wake of the London bombings of 7 July 2005. The report, headlined 'Nailed on Sunday', created some international media coverage, although the response in the UK was more muted. The Mail on Sunday responded by saying that they were investigating "a subject of great public interest" and had acted "responsibly", but did not deny the allegations.

Also in spring 2006, London Student was one of few in the country to take a strong supportive stance of lecturers concerning the Association of University Teachers (AUT) and National Association of Teachers in Further and Higher Education (NATFHE), now the University and College Union (UCU), joint strike action as they fought for better pay and conditions. The story led the paper from Christmas onwards, with the exception of the issue containing 'Nailed on Sunday'.

In October 2013, the paper broke the story that departing University College London (UCL) Provost Malcolm Grant's leaving party cost the college over £17,000. The story was later picked up by local and national newspapers.

In January 2018, London Student exposed the existence at UCL of secret conferences on eugenics and intelligence with speakers including white supremacists. The story was picked up by the national papers, many crediting London Student in their reports.

== Design ==
For many years, the newspaper was a red-top tabloid. This changed when Patrick Ward was editor, with a transition toward a midmarket newspaper that better matched the more serious journalistic style of the paper's contributors. The cultural pullout section also returned, under the new name of 'Play'.

In 2012, the newspaper had to cut back due to funding difficulties with ULU, meaning the paper was condensed, with many sections shortened, although none were removed.

The newspaper's format was heavily redesigned under Oscar Webb's tenure by Deputy Editor Adam Gillett, bringing it closer in style to a mainstream publication and introducing the redesigned 'The Smoke' culture section.

== Culture section ==
"Play" was the London Student's culture pullout section, replaced by "The Smoke" in 2013 and "Skirr" in 2015. It had various pages devoted to certain cultural coverage, including Music, Arts, Food, Theatre and Fashion, as well as often multidisciplinary features. Each section often gained access to national press events, previews and interviews with significant artists or people prominent within each cultural discipline: Roots Manuva, Park Chan-Wook, Iain Rankin, British Sea Power, Doug Stanhope, Ruby Tandoh, Michael Horovitz, Of Montreal, The Coen Brothers and They Might Be Giants were featured in previous issues of the magazine, among other notable figures.

Past editors of the sections have included Rena Minegishi, Emma Hope Allwood, Bryony Bowie, Jake-Pace Lawrie, Robert Kiely, Kate Vine, Rina Buznea, Peter Yeung, Jack Kirby and Matt Williamson. After the proposed closure of the University of London Union in the 2014/15 academic year, "The Smoke" became the final edition of London Student's cultural supplement. "Skirr" replaced it in 2015/16 under the editorship of then London Student co-editors Dea Gjinovci, Ben Jackson, Ed Ive, James Smith, and Donato Paolo Mancini.

== Competition ==
College magazines, such as University College London's Pi, King's College London's Roar and Queen Mary, University of London's Cub, generally offer a different style of coverage to London Student, there is genuine competition in terms of breaking news from five college newspapers: Felix at Imperial College London, The Beaver at the London School of Economics, The Lion at Heythrop College and The Orbital and The Founder at Royal Holloway, University of London, as well as investigative student publications such as UCL's The Cheese Grater. Editions of the commercial The Sanctuary newspaper added marginally to competition at University College London and the London School of Economics during the academic year 2007–8.

== Sennet ==
Sennet was the direct predecessor of London Student. It was published from 1954. Its first three editors were Fred Allgood, Dinesh Kale and Peter Stamford. In 1959 the editor was Jean Rook, later best known for her long association with the Daily Express where she was nicknamed the "first lady of Fleet Street".

Extensive, though incomplete, archives of both newspapers are held at both the University of London's library, and the British Library Newspaper section in Colindale.
