= University of London Union =

Student union of the University of London

- Institution: University of London
- Location: Malet Street, London, England
- Established: 1921
- Abolished: 2014
- Members: 120,000+
- Website: www.studentcentral.london

The University of London Union (ULU), known as Student Central after 2014, was the students' union of the federal University of London. Since the closure of its student governance, each student is instead primarily affiliated to a students' union of their individual college, as the University of London is a federal structure encompassing many constituent colleges.

ULU provided a range of services on an intercollegiate basis, including cultural, recreational and sporting activities. Its seven-floor building in Malet Street, Central London, next to Birkbeck, University of London, included bars, restaurants, shops, banks, a swimming pool and a live music venue.

In 2021 Student Central closed and the university leased the building to Birkbeck College to expand their teaching space.

== History ==
Logo during Student Central period

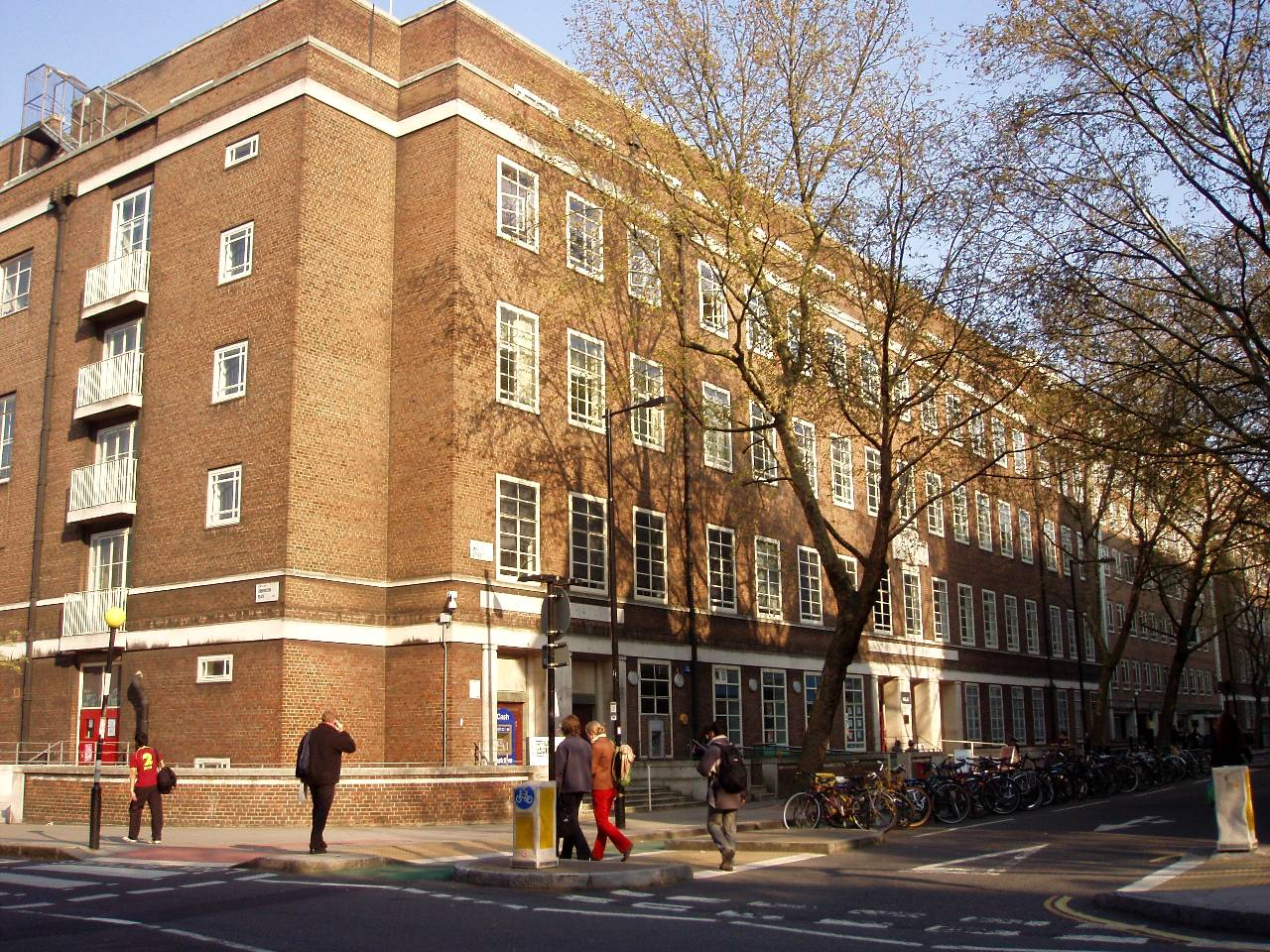
University of London Union on Malet Street

ULU was founded in 1921, originally as the University of London Union Society, and moved into its main building on Malet Street, near Senate House, in 1957. It represented students to the university and beyond, whilst also providing support and resources to the students' unions of individual colleges.

On 3 May 2013, the University of London announced that the union would cease to exist. This move was condemned by some students and campaign groups, who ran a campaign to keep the building in student hands. Other students however welcomed the move; this was in part due to fears that the union was undemocratic, as it recorded a very low election turnout of just 2%. This was against the backdrop of higher turnouts at other students' union elections.

At the time of its closure it was one of Europe's largest students' unions representing over 120,000 University of London students.

Upon the University of London Union's abolition its former building and its website were rebranded as Student Central, London, and operated by the former staff of ULU employed by the University of London. It offered full membership to University of London students, and associate membership to other university students and members of other groups.

In March 2017 the promoter and event management company VMS Live agreed a deal with Student Central to bring live music back to the former ULU venue.

== Activities ==
ULU aimed to represent the diverse students and students' unions of the University of London.

The ULU building and venue was widely known as one for gigs that launched major artists such as the Kaiser Chiefs and Goldfrapp. At one point in the early 1990s, future comedy superstar Ricky Gervais managed the venue.

The union funded and published a student newspaper, London Student, although the editorial content was not controlled by the union as a whole but solely by the elected Editor. London Student was relaunched as a co-operative in January 2015.

=== Sports ===
One of ULU's main activities was the provision of Sport Leagues and Sport Clubs. The leagues originally only included teams within the University of London. Now they include University teams from the London area that are not in UoL. The governance of these is carried out by Sports Officers from the Universities and Colleges Students' Unions that have at least one sports team in the league. The sports leagues are also supported by the Friends of University of London Sport, whose members were former Sports Officers from within the University of London.

The union was home to Central London's largest swimming pool.

In 2015, the UL Athletics and XC club established the London Colleges Athletics Series (LCAS) along with King's College London, University College London and Imperial College London. LCAS has since merged with the long-standing London Colleges League to form the London Universities and Colleges Athletics.
