= Jeff Moore (soccer) =

American soccer player

Personal information
- Full name: Jeffrey Eric Moore
- Date of birth: January 15, 1980 (age 46)
- Place of birth: Gloucester Township, New Jersey, U.S.
- Position: Midfielder

College career
Years	Team	Apps	(Gls)
1999–2002	Richard Stockton Ospreys		

Senior career*
Years	Team	Apps	(Gls)
2002	MetroStars	18	(0)
2003	Virginia Beach Mariners	16	(0)
2004–2005	Philadelphia KiXX (indoor)	33	(5)

Managerial career
- 2006–2011: Stockton Ospreys (assistant)
- * Club domestic league appearances and goals

Jeffrey Eric Moore (born January 15, 1980) is an American retired soccer player. After his playing career, Moore worked for six seasons as an assistant coach for his alma mater, Stockton University.

Raised in Gloucester Township, New Jersey, Moore played prep soccer at Triton Regional High School.
