= Jean Rook =

English journalist

Jean Kathleen Rook
- Born: 13 November 1931; Kingston upon Hull, East Riding of Yorkshire, England
- Died: 5 September 1991 (aged 59); Royal Tunbridge Wells, Kent, England
- Education: Malet Lambert High School; Bedford College
- Occupation: Journalist

Jean Kathleen Rook (13 November 1931 – 5 September 1991) was an English journalist dubbed The First Lady of Fleet Street for her regular opinion column in the Daily Express. She was also, along with Lynda Lee-Potter, a model for the Glenda Slagg column in the satirical magazine Private Eye. Rook was the highest-paid woman on Fleet Street, London, then the centre of the British newspaper industry.

== Early life and career ==
Jean Rook was the daughter of an engineer, Horace Rook, a consultant engineer from Boston, Lincolnshire, and a cinema usherette, Freda Garton. Jean was born in Kingston upon Hull and raised in the East Riding of Yorkshire. She was educated at Malet Lambert High School in Hull and Bedford College, part of the University of London, where she became the first woman to edit the university's Sunday newspaper, Sennet. She read English, and graduated in 1954 with an upper second-class degree. Rook took an MA in 1956.

She began her professional career as a reporter on the Sheffield Telegraph, where she had won a place on their graduate trainee scheme. Rook became the women's editor, before becoming fashion editor at The Yorkshire Post in Leeds. From there, she moved to London and took up the same role at Flair, a fashion magazine. In 1964, having been invited by Hugh Cudlipp to join The Sun newspaper when he launched it, she became its fashion editor.

== First Lady of Fleet Street ==
Rook moved from The Sun to the Daily Sketch, and the circulation "soared" when she ran a 'Save our mini-skirt' campaign for the editor, David English, at a time when hemlines were falling. Whilst English was editor, the newspaper merged with the Daily Mail in 1971, and Rook was appointed women's editor of the latter publication. The following year, the paper's main rival, the Daily Express, lured her away from the Daily Mail to become their women's editor. Rook was soon penning a weekly column for the Daily Express with a large following.

In an interview, Rook described how she had "clawed and scrambled" her way to become "the First Lady of Fleet Street ... Britain's bitchiest, best known, loved and loathed woman journalist". This nickname was given to Rook whilst she was at the Daily Express, by the paper's deputy editor. Rook was renamed the First Bitch of Fleet Street, a title which she believed came from the actor Derek Nimmo.

She also owned up to having been the original model for Private Eye's female columnist Glenda Slagg. Rook enjoyed her position as a newspaper columnist, and dressed in brassy style, with chunky accessories, but she had the opinions and language to match 'the look' and was proud of her success in what was a male-dominated industry.

Rook's never-less-than-outrageous column became the vehicle for wild swings of opinion and no subject was taboo. The critic Clive James observed, having watched an appearance she made on the BBC2 programme Don't Quote Me in 1975: "Unusually prone to writing and talking in clichés, she nevertheless commands a sure sense of the proper time to trade in one set of bromides for another. Bryan Magee read some of her own prose to her. It bore out the Margo MacDonald/Anna Raeburn case [that the Press tended to put Woman in her Place], in all respects, but Rook was in no whit abashed. 'That was written in 1971, she protested confidently. Everybody thought that then.'"

Even Rook's adoring readers sometimes found her unashamed vulgarity too much to bear, but despite this, after nearly two decades working for the Daily Express, she remained an institution. Rook interviewed scores of public figures, including Margaret Thatcher, Indira Gandhi, Elizabeth Taylor and Barry Humphries, applying her "down-to-earth" approach in every interview. She summed this up by saying, "You know why I'm popular with the readers? Because I'm as ordinary as they are".

Rook was an admirer of Thatcher's, later claiming to be the first journalist to have taken her seriously, and to predict she would be Britain's first female prime minister. Going against the line taken by the Daily Express, Rook backed Thatcher in the 1975 Conservative Party leadership contest. She interviewed Thatcher nine times from 1974 to 1989.

She is also recalled for her blatant homophobia, and discrimination against and apparent dislike of lesbians. She has been criticised for the harm she caused to the LGBT community at the end of the 1970s, both in the case of Maureen Colquhoun and in the 1978 case of lesbian mothers.

== Personal life and death ==
Rook married journalist Geoffrey Nash (1923–1988), whom she had met on the Sheffield Telegraph, on 3 July 1965. The couple had a son.

According to a biographer, Rook "enjoyed living up to her tough, hard-bitten, and outrageous reputation, clanking with extravagant gold jewellery, and driving a Jaguar. She was highly professional, and addicted to work, but in her private life she was a warm-hearted Yorkshirewoman, devoted to her family." Rook wrote several books: Dressing for Success (1968), Rook's Eye View (1979), which compiled some of her work for the Daily Express; and The Cowardly Lioness, her autobiography (1989).

In 1989, Rook was diagnosed with breast cancer, and shared her experiences with her readers as the disease progressed. The following year, she was a guest on the BBC Radio 4 programme Desert Island Discs.

She died aged 59, on 5 September 1991, in the Nuffield Hospital, Royal Tunbridge Wells, Kent.
