= Triton Regional High School (New Jersey) =

High school in Camden County, New Jersey, US

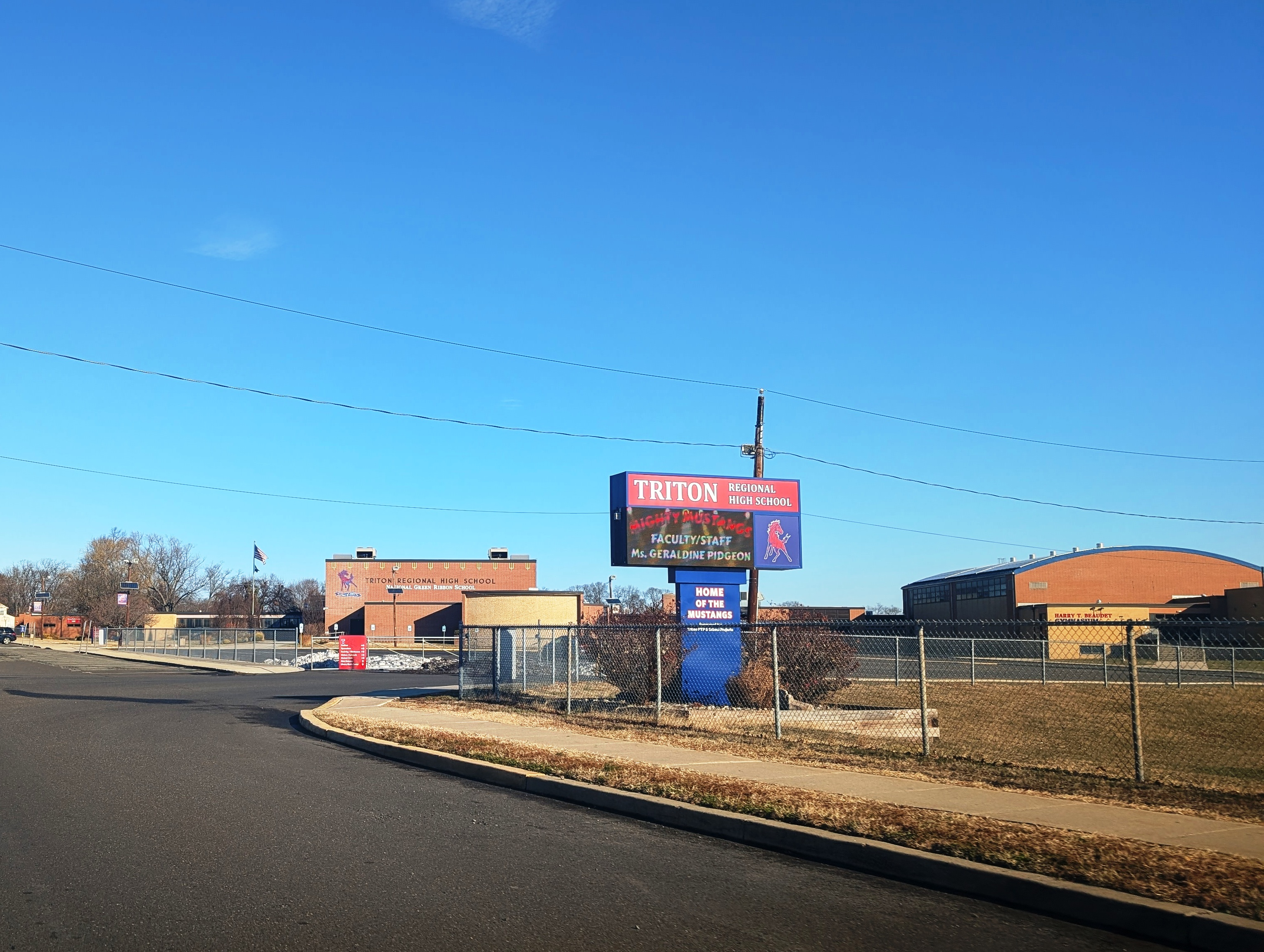

Location
- 250 Schubert Avenue; Runnemede, Camden County, New Jersey 08078; United States; 39.849029°N 75.064091°W

Information
- Type: Public high school
- Established: 1957
- School district: Black Horse Pike Regional School District
- NCES School ID: 340177001338
- Principal: Melissa Sheppard
- Faculty: 100.1 FTEs
- Enrollment: 1,146 (as of 2024–25)
- Student to teacher ratio: 11.5:1
- Colors: Scarlet and royal blue
- Athletics conference: Tri-County Conference (general); West Jersey Football League (football)
- Team name: Mustangs
- Website: ths.bhprsd.org

Triton Regional High School is a four-year comprehensive regional public high school serving students in ninth through twelfth grades from Bellmawr, Gloucester Township and Runnemede, three communities in Camden County, in the U.S. state of New Jersey, operating as one of three secondary schools of the Black Horse Pike Regional School District. Triton serves all students from Bellmawr and Runnemede, along with those from the northern portion of Gloucester Township.

As of the 2024–25 school year, the school had an enrollment of 1,146 students and 100.1 classroom teachers (on an FTE basis), for a student–teacher ratio of 11.5:1. There were 317 students (27.7% of enrollment) eligible for free lunch and 196 (17.1% of students) eligible for reduced-cost lunch.

== History ==
Voters approved spending $2.3 million (equivalent to $22.2 million in 2025) for the construction of Triton Regional High School, the district's first facility. The school opened in September 1957 with a total of 980 students. The school celebrated its 50th anniversary during the 2006–07 school year.

In October 2012, five of Triton's faculty and administration were charged in having sexual affairs with students. Three teachers (Nick Martinelli, Daniel Michielli, and Jeffrey Logandro) were charged for actually having committed sexual misconduct, while two administrators (Principal Catherine DePaul and Vice Principal Jernee Kollock) were charged for covering up the incident. In wake of the teachers' firings, many different substitute teachers took the places of Logandro, Martinelli, and Michielli, Triton alumnus Daniel Mackie was appointed Interim Principal (in place of DePaul) for the remainder of the 2012–2013 school year, while Lynne Sireci was named interim 9th Grade Vice Principal (in place of Kollock) for the remainder of 2012–2013 until July 1, 2013. Starting July 1, 2013, longtime Black Horse Pike Regional School District employee and fellow Triton alumnus Melissa Sheppard was appointed Triton's new principal for the 2013–2014 school year and beyond, while current Triton Vice Principal Harold Little would take over the role as the Class of 2016's Vice Principal (the role Kollock had prior to her firing). Little would remain the Class of 2016's Vice Principal until their graduation in June 2016.

== Awards, recognition and rankings ==
The school was the 241st-ranked public high school in New Jersey out of 339 schools statewide in New Jersey Monthly magazine's September 2014 cover story on the state's "Top Public High Schools", using a new ranking methodology. The school had been ranked 271st in the state of 328 schools in 2012, after being ranked 278th in 2010 out of 322 schools listed. The magazine ranked the school 221st in 2008 out of 316 schools. The school was ranked 236th in the magazine's September 2006 issue, which surveyed 316 schools across the state.

== Athletics ==
The Triton Regional High School Mustangs compete as one of the member schools in the Tri-County Conference, which is comprised of public and private high schools located in Camden, Cape May, Cumberland, Gloucester and Salem counties. The conference is overseen by the New Jersey State Interscholastic Athletic Association (NJSIAA). With 830 students in grades 10-12, the school was classified by the NJSIAA for the 2019–20 school year as Group III for most athletic competition purposes, which included schools with an enrollment of 761 to 1,058 students in that grade range. The football team competes in the National Division of the 94-team West Jersey Football League superconference and was classified by the NJSIAA as Group III South for football for 2024–2026, which included schools with 695 to 882 students.

The baseball team won the South Jersey Group III state sectional championship in 1959 and 1970.

The field hockey team won the South Jersey Group III state sectional championship in 1983.

== Marching band ==
The school's marching band won the Chapter One Championships in 2000-2002, 2004, 2008, 2010, and 2011. They were also the 2001 Atlantic Coast Champion in Group 1. They went on to become the 2011 Atlantic Coast Champion in Group 1A.

The school's indoor drumline was the Tournament Indoor Association Scholastic A champions in 1997 and 1999, and the Scholastic Open Concert champions in 2001, 2002, 2003, 2004, 2006, 2007, 2008, 2009, 2010, 2011, 2012, 2013, and 2022.

The school's indoor color guard was the Tournament Indoor Association Scholastic Open champions in 1999 and 2002. In 2009, they were the TIA Scholastic A champions. In 2010, they were Mid-Atlantic Indoor Network champions and placed 5th at the Winter Guard International South Brunswick Regional, held at South Brunswick High School. The color guard has since been discontinued.

== Administration ==
The school's principal is Melissa Sheppard. Her core administration includes four vice principals, one for each graduating class.

== Other district high schools ==
Including Triton, there are three high schools within the jurisdiction of the Black Horse Pike Regional School District. Students attend one of the three based upon their area of residence. The other two schools (with 2021–22 enrollment from the National Center for Education Statistics) are:

- Highland Regional High School: Located in Blackwood, Highland opened in 1967 and served 1,150 students from Gloucester Township.
- Timber Creek Regional High School: Located in Erial, Timber Creek, established in 2001, is the newest of the three high schools within the Black Horse Pike Regional School District. Timber Creek served 1,109 students from Gloucester Township.

== Notable alumni ==
Notable alumni of Triton Regional High School include:

- Rob Andrews (born 1957; class of 1975), member of Congress from New Jersey's 1st congressional district
- Chrissy Conway (born 1979; class of 1997), Contemporary Christian music singer/songwriter and former member of the groups Choice and ZOEgirl
- Michael Iaconelli (born 1972, class of 1990), bass fisherman
- David R. Mayer (born 1967, class of 1985), New Jersey General Assembly member who represented the 4th Legislative District from 2002 to 2008
- Bill Moen (class of 2005), New Jersey State Assemblyman
- Jeff Moore (born 1980), retired soccer player
- Jack O'Halloran (born 1943; class of 1961), boxer and actor who appeared in Superman and Superman II
- A. Raymond Randolph (born 1943; class of 1961), federal judge on the United States Court of Appeals for the District of Columbia Circuit who was appointed to the court in 1990
- Lisa Regina (born c. 1961; class of 1979-1980), actress, screenwriter, director and acting coach
