= Two Tonys =

- The Sopranos episode
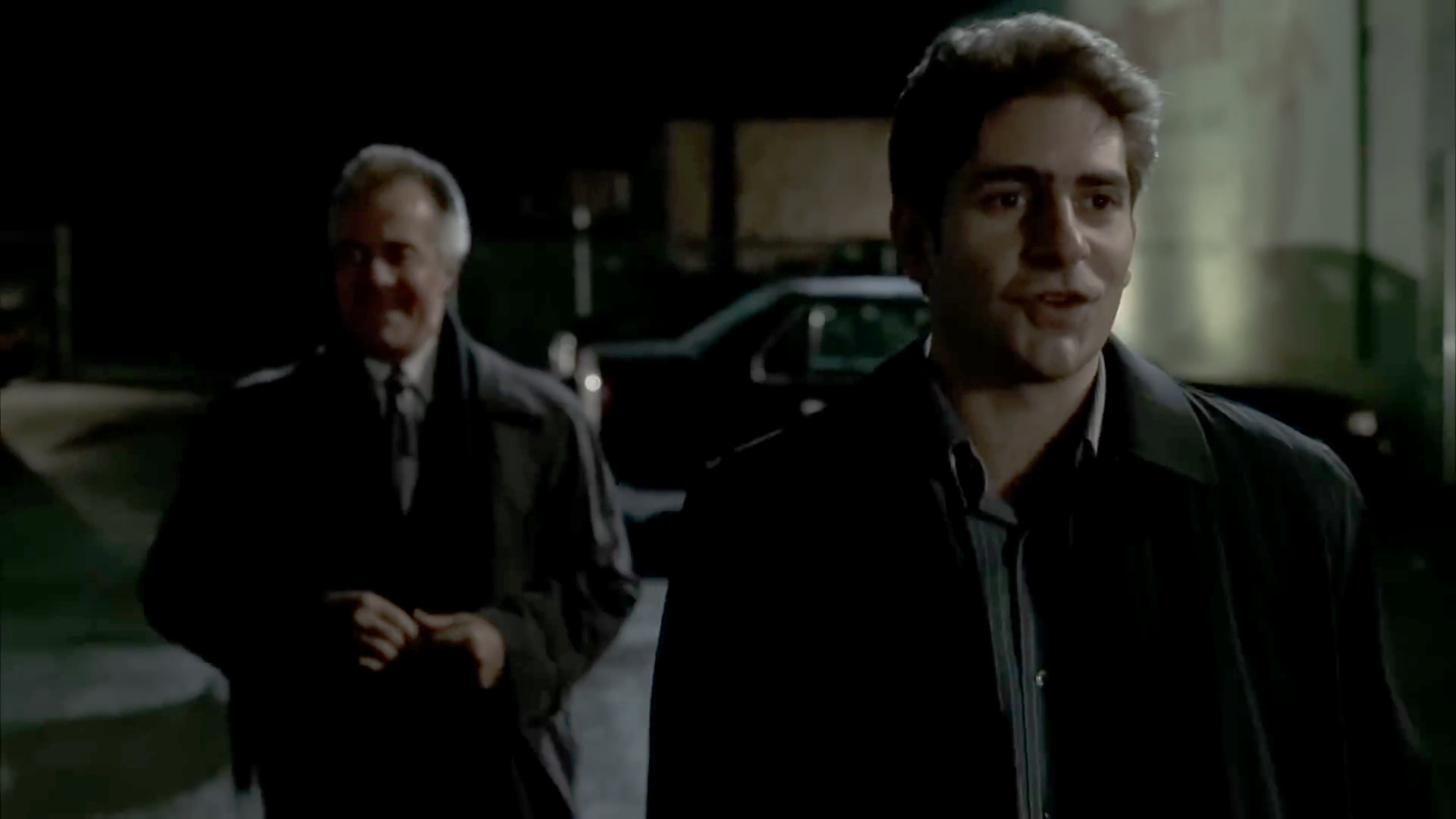
- Christopher Moltisanti arguing with Paulie Gualtieri
- Episode no.: Season 5 Episode 1
- Directed by: Tim Van Patten
- Written by: David Chase; Terence Winter
- Cinematography by: Phil Abraham
- Production code: 501
- Original air date: March 7, 2004
- Running time: 54 minutes

Episode chronology
← Previous "Whitecaps"	Next → "Rat Pack"
- The Sopranos season 5

"Two Tonys" is the 53rd episode of the HBO original series The Sopranos and the first of the show's fifth season. Written by David Chase and Terence Winter, it was directed by Tim Van Patten and originally aired on March 7, 2004.

The episode introduced new cast member Steve Buscemi as Tony Blundetto. It was seen by nearly 12 million viewers on its premiere, and critics praised the episode for its plot development, especially surrounding Tony Soprano's marital breakdown.

== Starring ==
- James Gandolfini as Tony Soprano
- Lorraine Bracco as Dr. Jennifer Melfi
- Edie Falco as Carmela Soprano
- Michael Imperioli as Christopher Moltisanti
- Dominic Chianese as Corrado Soprano, Jr.
- Steven Van Zandt as Silvio Dante
- Tony Sirico as Paulie Gualtieri
- Robert Iler as Anthony Soprano, Jr.
- Jamie-Lynn DiScala as Meadow Soprano
- Drea de Matteo as Adriana La Cerva
- Aida Turturro as Janice Soprano Baccalieri
- Steven R. Schirripa as Bobby Baccalieri
- Vincent Curatola as Johnny Sack
- Steve Buscemi as Tony Blundetto**

** = photo only

=== Guest starring ===
- Robert Loggia as Feech La Manna
- Peter Bogdanovich as Dr. Elliot Kupferberg
- Ray Abruzzo as Carmine Lupertazzi, Jr.
- Joe Santos as Angelo Garepe
- Leslie Bega as Valentina La Paz
- Carl Capotorto as Little Paulie Germani
- Robert John Burke as Officer Zmuda
- Frank Vincent as Phil Leotardo**
- Joseph R. Gannascoli as Vito Spatafore
- Dan Grimaldi as Patsy Parisi
- Max Casella as Benny Fazio
- George Loros as Raymond Curto
- Arthur Nascarella as Carlo Gervasi
- Tony Lip as Carmine Lupertazzi
- Omar Chagall as Raoul
- John Elsen as Officer Yorn
- Sukanya Krishnan as Reporter
- Matthew Weiner as Manny Safier
- Miryam Coppersmith as Sophia Baccalieri
- Denise Borino as Ginny Sacrimoni
- Allison Dunbar as Nicole Lupertazzi
- Jeffrey R. Marchetti as Petey
- Maria Baan as Fran
- Lisa Regina as Kim
- Barbara Christabella as Patti
- Anna Maniscalco as Bernice
- Bill Quigley as Waiter
- Laurie Rosenwald as Woman
- Ginger Kearns as Pierced Girl
- Jason Ongoco as Delivery Guy

** = photo only

== Synopsis ==
One year after his separation, Tony is living in his mother's former home. One evening, a large black bear appears at the Soprano house while A.J. is in the backyard. Terrified, he calls for Carmela, who drives off the bear and calls authorities. Tony visits the next day and talks to Carmela, but the discussion turns hostile when she criticizes him for buying A.J. too many gifts. As they argue about money, Carmela accuses Tony of calling Italy on his cellphone, and he tells her that Furio is “a dead man” if certain people find him. Tony tasks Benny and Little Paulie to guard his backyard, and Carmela reluctantly supplies them with a rifle.

After watching The Prince of Tides with his mistress, Valentina, Tony feels driven to see Dr. Melfi again, sending flowers and a greeting card to her office. When he calls her to set up a date, she declines, feeling that it would be unprofessional to date a former patient. Melfi has a sexual dream about Tony. He then schedules an appointment, an opportunity to tell her he loves her. He forcibly kisses her; she tactfully makes him desist. In a therapy session with her own psychiatrist, Melfi admits her initial attraction to Tony. Tony makes a third attempt to court her by offering cruise tickets, but she declines again. At his request, she tells him the aspects of his character she could not accept; but there are things he cannot bear to hear, and he storms out. Tony returns home, in a sense, and takes over guard duty from Benny.

Four mobsters imprisoned in the 1980s are released on parole. Three of them are a generation older than Tony: Soprano family capo Michele "Feech" La Manna, Lupertazzi family consigliere Angelo Garepe, and Lupertazzi capo Phil Leotardo. The fourth is Tony's cousin, Tony "Tony B" Blundetto. Feech wishes to return to work as a shy and sports bettor, which Tony and Uncle Junior permit so long as he does not compete with other operators. Tony is excited about Tony B's release because they used to be close friends, and plans a lavish welcome party. Carmine Lupertazzi has a stroke while having lunch with Tony, Angelo and Johnny Sack, ending up in the hospital. There, Johnny tells Tony that he is still angry that he backed out of their agreement to kill Carmine the previous year.

Meanwhile, Christopher Moltisanti and Paulie Gualtieri confront each other when their re-telling of their Pine Barrens ordeal devolves into mutual recriminations. Christopher begins to resent the custom that, being of lower rank, he is expected to pay when they dine in a restaurant. One evening, he forces Paulie to pay, but Paulie demands that Christopher repay him the next day and threatens that interest will be added if he does not. When he complains to Tony, he tells Christopher to keep paying the tabs, as he himself once did. In Atlantic City, Paulie contrives to inflate their dinner bill to nearly $1,200. As they argue in the parking lot, their waiter confronts Christopher about his poor tip, and when they dismiss him, he insults them. An enraged Christopher throws a brick at his head. The waiter collapses and has a seizure, causing a panicked Paulie to shoot him dead. Paulie takes the $1,200 as he and Christopher speed off in their cars. The next day, they make amends and split the original tab.

== First appearances ==
- Michele "Feech" La Manna: former capo of the now-defunct La Manna crew who was incarcerated during the 1980s
- Angelo Garepe: longtime Lupertazzi family Consigliere
- Phil Leotardo: (image only) Capo of the Lupertazzi family who was sent to prison in the early 1980s
- Tony Blundetto: (image only) Tony's cousin and DiMeo/Soprano crime family member who was sent to jail in 1986 for hijacking a truck

== Deceased ==
- Raoul: an Atlantic City waiter who complained to Paulie and Christopher about a poor tip. Christopher hit him in the head with a brick, causing him to have a seizure. Paulie then shot Raoul dead.

== Production ==
- The new addition to the series writing staff beginning with Season 5, Matthew Weiner, plays the Mafia expert on the news broadcast who introduces the new gangster characters. Previously, series writers Terence Winter and David Chase also made cameo appearances on the show, as Dr. Melfi's patient and a man in Italy, respectively.
- Steve Buscemi joins the main cast as Tony Blundetto and is now billed in the opening credits, although he does not appear in this episode other than in the form of photographs during the "Class of '04" news report. Buscemi previously directed two Sopranos episodes, "Pine Barrens" (Season 3) and "Everybody Hurts" (Season 4), and he continued to direct for the show, as well as act.
- Jamie-Lynn Sigler is billed by her married name as "Jamie-Lynn DiScala" during this season.
- Vince Curatola is now exclusively billed in an individual credit from this point onwards. During Season 4 he had often been billed in a pairing with another actor. He is still only billed for the episodes in which he appears, however.
- The character Sophia Baccalieri is now played by Miryam Coppersmith, who replaced Lexie Sperduto from Season 4.
- Tony's famous red 1999 Chevrolet Suburban is swapped for a 2003 Cadillac Escalade ESV.
- Toni Kalem, who plays Angie Bonpensiero in the series, becomes a story editor for the show starting with this episode.
- This episode is the first season opener wherein Tony is not featured picking up The Star-Ledger at the foot of his driveway. Instead, Meadow runs over the newspaper with her car.
- This is the first episode to mention that the Sopranos live in North Caldwell, which is where the filming house is also located.
- The preface to an April 10, 2002 Star-Ledger article titled, "Jersey mob soon to get infusion of old blood: Lawmen are wary as jail terms end" reads: Sopranos creator David Chase revealed that the story arc of Season 5 was inspired by a Star-Ledger article on the RICO trials of the '80s.

== Music ==
- The song played in the opening scenes, then playing on Carmela's radio, and then over the end credits is "Heaven Only Knows" by Emmylou Harris.
- The song blaring from Meadow's car when she comes to pick up A.J. is "Bichu Rap" by Titi Robin and Gulabo Sapera.
- Carmela sings the title line from jazz standard "It's So Nice To Have A Man Around The House" to encourage AJ to do chores.
- The song playing at the restaurant where the guys eat dinner with their goomahs is "Mia Serenata" by Jimmy Fontana.
- At the start of the scene where Tony's crew were having dinner at the Atlantic City restaurant, "Band of Gold" by Freda Payne is played, as is "Let's Get It On" by Marvin Gaye.

== Reception ==
On its premiere on HBO on March 7, 2004, "Two Tonys" had 12.1 million viewers for a 6.2 rating and 15 share in the 18-49 age group. The only broadcast television show in its timeslot to have better viewership was Law & Order: Criminal Intent on NBC. The viewership of 12.1 million was 25 percent lower than the ratings for the season four debut in September 2002; Washington Post critic Lisa de Moraes attributed the weaker ratings to season five debuting in March rather than the more traditional September. However, among homes that subscribed to HBO, "Two Tonys" set a new ratings record of 23.8.

Critical reception for this season premiere was largely positive. Los Angeles Times critic Carina Chocano observed the episode had "variations on the big themes of trust, betrayal, strength and vulnerability" that defined The Sopranos. Other critics also noted the character development. Tom Shales of The Washington Post wrote: "The characters in 'The Sopranos' grow and evolve; they even learn and, in one or two cases, mature." For USA Today, Robert Bianco rated this season three and a half out of four stars, describing Tony Soprano as "a character more complex, perplexing and believably real than anything a reality show can convey." For The New York Times, Alessandra Stanley compared A.J.'s negative attitude towards his mother Carmela to The O.C.

Television Without Pity graded the episode an A−, regarding the clips of The Prince of Tides as "a spot-on parody of [Tony Soprano's] relationship with [Dr.] Melfi" and "subtextually relevant". For The Star-Ledger, Alan Sepinwall found tragic humor in the plotlines surrounding Tony's marital problems and affair with Dr. Melfi. Tim Goodman of the San Francisco Chronicle praised the episode as foreshadowing "a season of major upheaval and emotional resonance." For the San Jose Mercury News, Charlie McCollum rated the first four episodes of season five with four out of four stars, commenting: "The writing sparkles, the acting is unmatched and no TV series has ever been as well directed and produced."

However, Ken Tucker of Entertainment Weekly graded the episode with a C, questioning elements such as Tony making a reference to Phil McGraw.
