= Lisa Regina =

American actress

Lisa Regina (born c. 1961) is an American actress, screenwriter, director, and acting coach.

== Early life and education ==
Regina was born in Philadelphia and was raised in Gloucester Township, New Jersey. She attended Triton Regional High School before attending New York University.

== Career ==
Regina wrote, directed, and produced the documentary Kenny about a man suffering from the rare skin disease ichthyosis. The film promotes tolerance of others. This film won the Manhattan Global Film Festival and a Humanitarian Award. Her latest film, shot in New Jersey, is about bullying.

Among her acting credits, Regina played a minor character in an episode of The Sopranos. In 2006, she was cast in a recurring role on the soap opera All My Children. She has appeared in national commercial campaigns for Delta Sky Miles, K-Mart and Macy's, and as a host for the 2010 Maxwell Football Club awards.

In 2007, Regina began a stage performance called "A Write to Heal", which aims to raise awareness on domestic violence.

== Filmography ==
=== Film ===
Year	Title	Role	Notes
2000	Father Gaudio's Confession	Angela Mancini	
2001	The Lost Face	Karen Gold	
2005	The Tournament	Sophia	
2008	Priceless	Pam	
2009	The Mourning After	Sarah Chambers	
2010	Bronx Paradise	Tina Manfredi	
2016	79 Parts	Mrs. Slattery	
2016	River Guard	Richardson	
2019	79 Parts: Director's Cut	Vera	

=== Television ===
Year	Title	Role	Notes
2004	The Sopranos	Kim	Episode: "Two Tonys"
2004	Guiding Light	Kate Spade	Episode dated 15 December 2004
