= Randerson (footballer) =

Brazilian footballer (born 2004)

Personal information
- Full name: Randerson de Sousa Almeida
- Date of birth: 12 March 2004 (age 22)
- Place of birth: Salvador, Brazil
- Height: 1.84 m (6 ft 0 in)
- Position: Midfielder

Team information
- Current team: ABC

Youth career
- ABC

Senior career*
Years	Team	Apps	(Gls)
2023–	ABC	28	(1)
2024	→ Atlético Goianiense (loan)	2	(0)
- * Club domestic league appearances and goals as of 05:54, 27 October 2026 (UTC)

Randerson de Sousa Almeida (born 12 March 2004), simply known as Randerson, is a Brazilian professional footballer who plays as a midfielder for ABC.

== Career ==
Randerson was an ABC youth graduate, and was promoted to the first team in September 2023. On 4 October, he signed his first professional contract with the club, and made his senior debut the following day, starting in a 0–0 Série B away draw against Chapecoense.

Randerson scored his first senior goal on 28 January 2024, netting his team's second in a 3–2 Campeonato Potiguar away win over Potiguar de Mossoró. On 23 April, he was loaned to Série A side Atlético Goianiense until the end of the year.

Randerson made his top tier debut on 30 June 2024, coming on as a late substitute for Roni in a 1–1 away draw against Atlético Mineiro.

== Career statistics ==
As of 27 October 2026

Club	Season	League			State League		Cup		Continental		Other		Total	
Club	Season	Division	Apps	Goals	Apps	Goals	Apps	Goals	Apps	Goals	Apps	Goals	Apps	Goals
ABC	2023	Série B	5	0	—		—		—		—		5	0
ABC	2024	Série C	0	0	9	1	2	0	—		6 (Note: Appearance(s) in Copa do Nordeste)	0	17	1
ABC	2025	Série C	5	0	3	0	0	0	—		0	0	8	0
ABC	2026	Série D	2	0	9	0	1	0	—		7	0	19	0
ABC	Subtotal		7	0	21	1	3	0	—		13	0	49	1
Atlético Goianiense	2024	Série A	2	0	—		—		—		—		2	0
Career total			9	0	21	1	3	0	0	0	13	0	51	1
