= Gloucester Township, New Jersey =

Township in Camden County, New Jersey, US

- Township
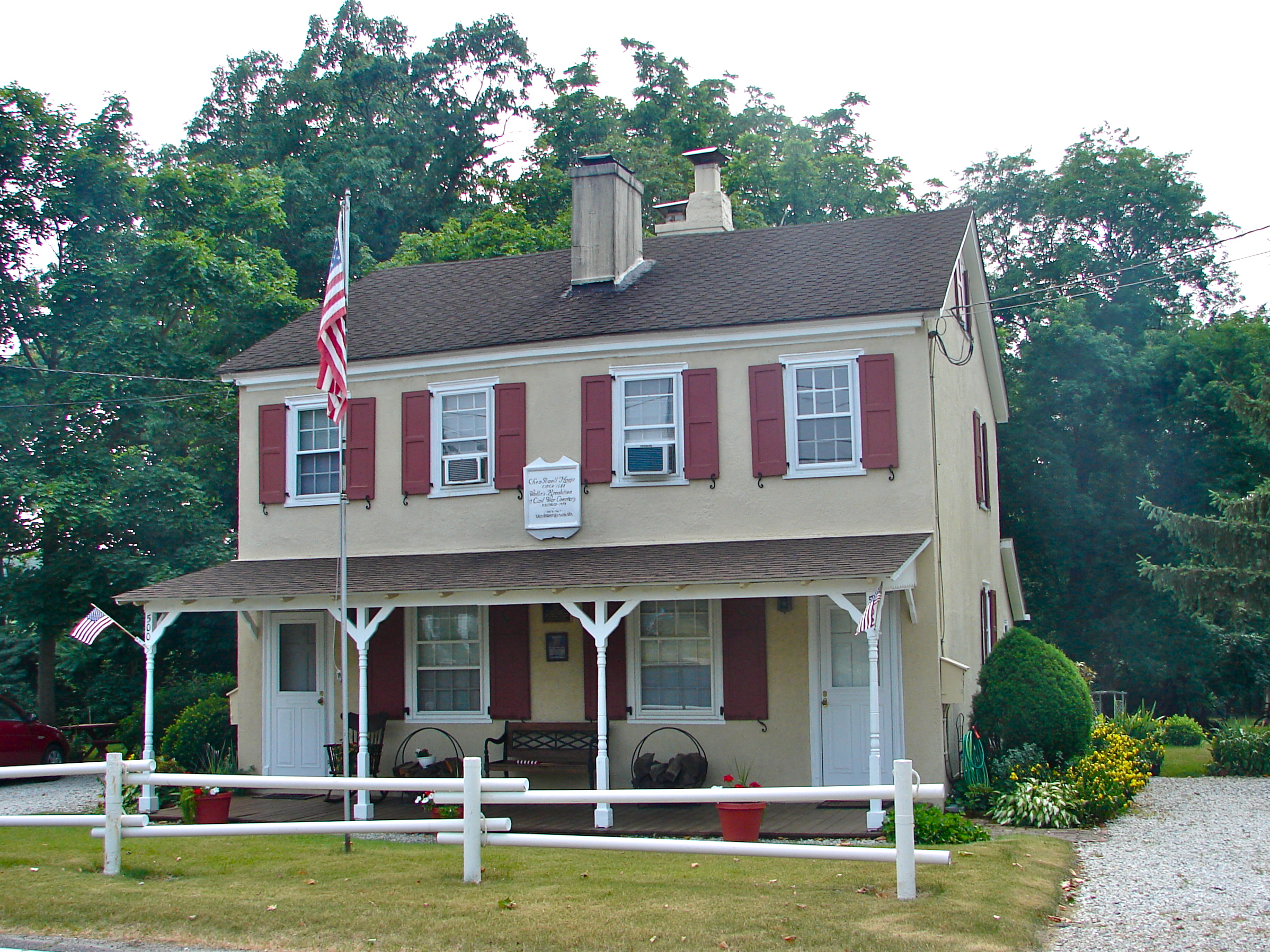
- Chew–Powell House

- Motto(s): "A great place to live, work and play."
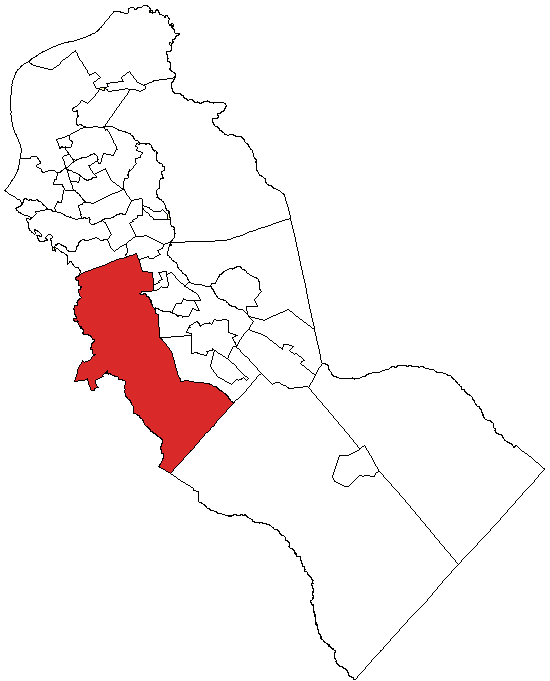
- Location of Gloucester Township in Camden County highlighted in red

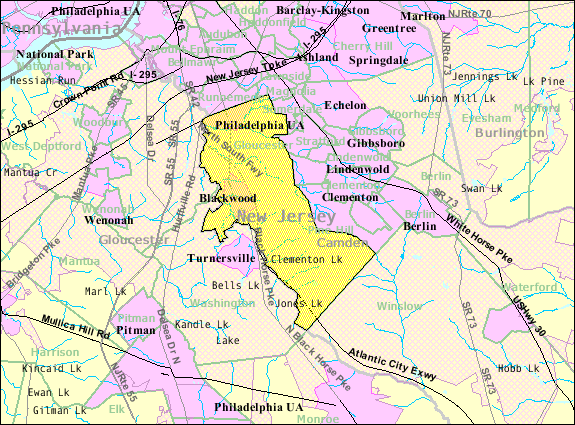
- Census Bureau map of Gloucester Township, New Jersey

- Location in Camden County Location in New Jersey Location in the United States
- Coordinates: 39.792186°N 75.036059°W
- Country: United States
- State: New Jersey
- County: Camden
- Formed: June 1, 1695
- Incorporated: February 21, 1798
- Named for: Gloucester, England

Government
  - Type: Faulkner Act (mayor–council)
  - Body: Township Council
  - Mayor: David R. Mayer (D, term ends December 31, 2025)
  - Municipal clerk: Nancy Power

Area
  - Total: 23.30 sq mi (60.34 km^{2})
  - Land: 22.95 sq mi (59.45 km^{2})
  - Water: 0.34 sq mi (0.88 km^{2}) 1.46%
  - Rank: 119th of 565 in state 4th of 37 in county
- Elevation: 118 ft (36 m)

Population (2020)
  - Total: 66,034
  - Estimate (2023): 66,239
  - Rank: 22nd of 565 in state 3rd of 37 in county
  - Density: 2,876.7/sq mi (1,110.7/km^{2})
  - Rank: 226th of 565 in state 25th of 37 in county
- Time zone: UTC−05:00 (Eastern (EST))
  - Summer (DST): UTC−04:00 (Eastern (EDT))
- ZIP Codes: 08012 – Blackwood; 08021 – Clementon; 08029 – Glendora; 08081 – Erial
- Area code: 856
- FIPS code: 3400726760
- GNIS feature ID: 0882154
- Website: www.glotwp.com

Gloucester Township is a township in Camden County in the U.S. state of New Jersey. As of the 2020 United States census, the township was the state's 22nd-most-populous municipality, with a population of 66,034, an increase of 1,400 (+2.2%) from the 2010 census count of 64,634, which in turn reflected an increase of 284 (+0.4%) from the 64,350 counted in the 2000 census. The township had been ranked as the 19th-most populous municipality in the state in 2010 after having been ranked 18th in 2000.

Gloucester Township was formed on June 1, 1695, while the area was still part of Gloucester County. It was incorporated as one of New Jersey's first 104 townships by an act of the New Jersey Legislature on February 21, 1798. When Camden County was established on March 13, 1844, it was included in that county. Over time, pieces of the township were taken to create Winslow Township (March 8, 1845), Clementon Township (February 24, 1903; dissolved on May 16, 1941; became Laurel Springs), and Union Township (November 15, 1831; dissolved on February 25, 1868, with remaining land chartered as Gloucester City). The township is part of South Jersey and constitutes part of the larger Philadelphia metropolitan area.

== History ==
Present Gloucester Township was one of the original townships that comprised old Gloucester County. It became the county's first political subdivision in 1685. The boundaries of Gloucester County extended from the Delaware River to the Atlantic Ocean until 1683, when it was divided into two townships; Egg Harbor Township and Gloucester Township, which took its name from the cathedral city of Gloucester on the banks of the River Severn in England. Gloucester Township further subdivided into four smaller townships, and on June 1, 1695, became one of the first New Jersey municipalities to incorporate. In 1844, the township became part of newly formed Camden County.

The Gabreil Daveis Tavern House, located at 4th Avenue in Glendora, is a pre-Revolutionary War tavern that was built in 1756 and for many years served as an inn for boatmen who transported their products to Philadelphia via nearby Big Timber Creek. It was recently restored and now serves as Gloucester Township's historical centerpiece. This building has also been referred to as the Hillman Hospital House because it was designated a hospital by George Washington during the Revolution. It is listed on the National Register of Historic Places and is open to visitors on Sunday afternoons from April through December, excepting holidays.

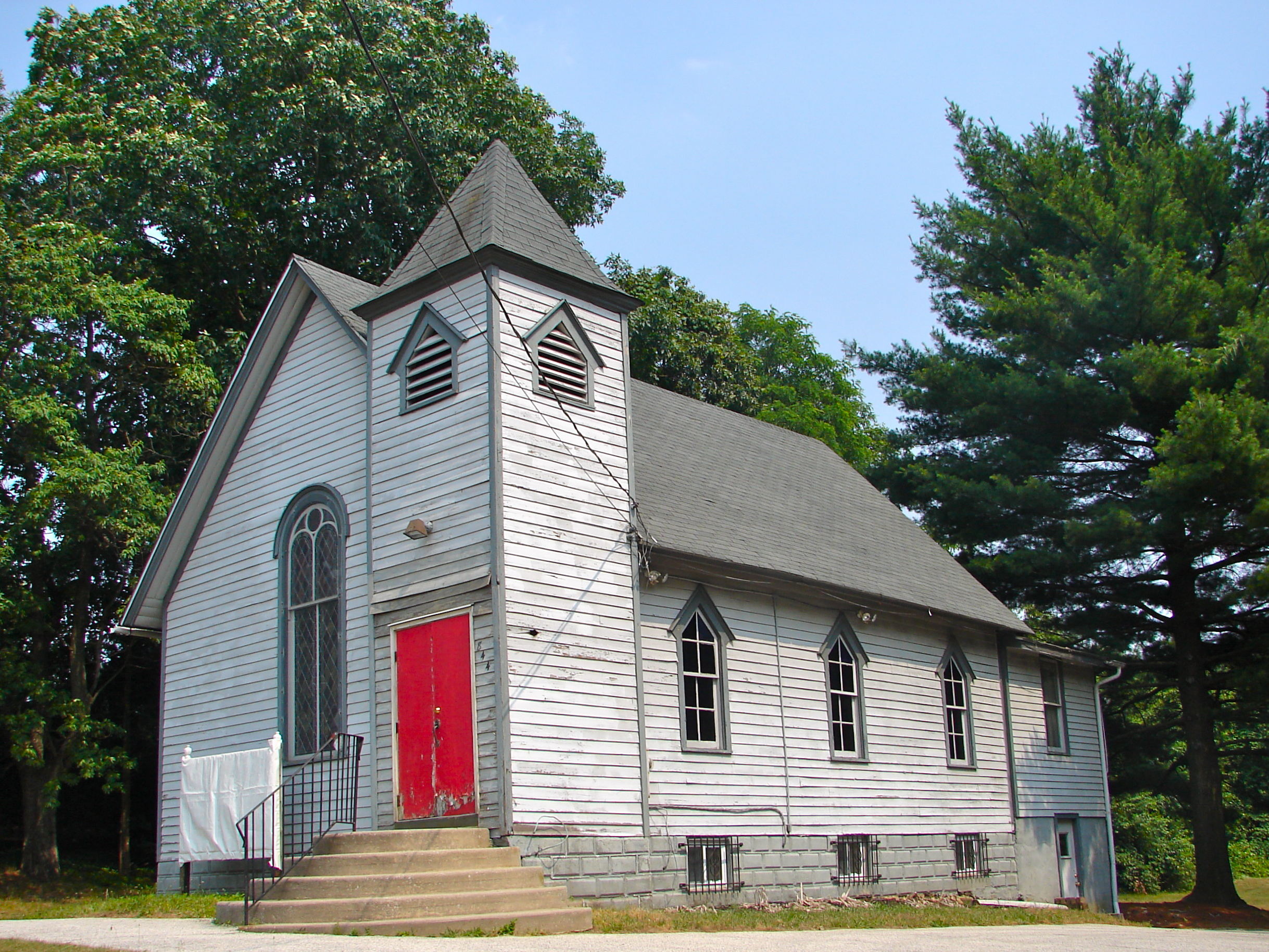
The former Solomon Wesley United Methodist Church

== Geography ==
According to the U.S. Census Bureau, the township had a total area of 23.30 square miles (60.34 km^{2}), including 22.95 square miles (59.45 km^{2}) of land and 0.34 square miles (0.88 km^{2}) of water (1.46%).

Blackwood (with a 2020 Census population of 4,622), Glendora (4,784), and Grenloch (863) are unincorporated communities and census-designated places (CDPs) entirely or partially located within the township. Other unincorporated communities, localities and place names located partially or completely within the township include Blenheim, Chews Landing, Davisville, Erial, Glen Oaks, Hilltop, Lakeland, Lambs Terrace, Little Gloucester, Nashs Mill Point Pleasant and Turkey Foot.

The township borders the municipalities of Hi-Nella, Lindenwold, Magnolia, Pine Hill, Runnemede, Somerdale, Stratford and Winslow Township in Camden County; and Deptford Township and Washington Township in Gloucester County.

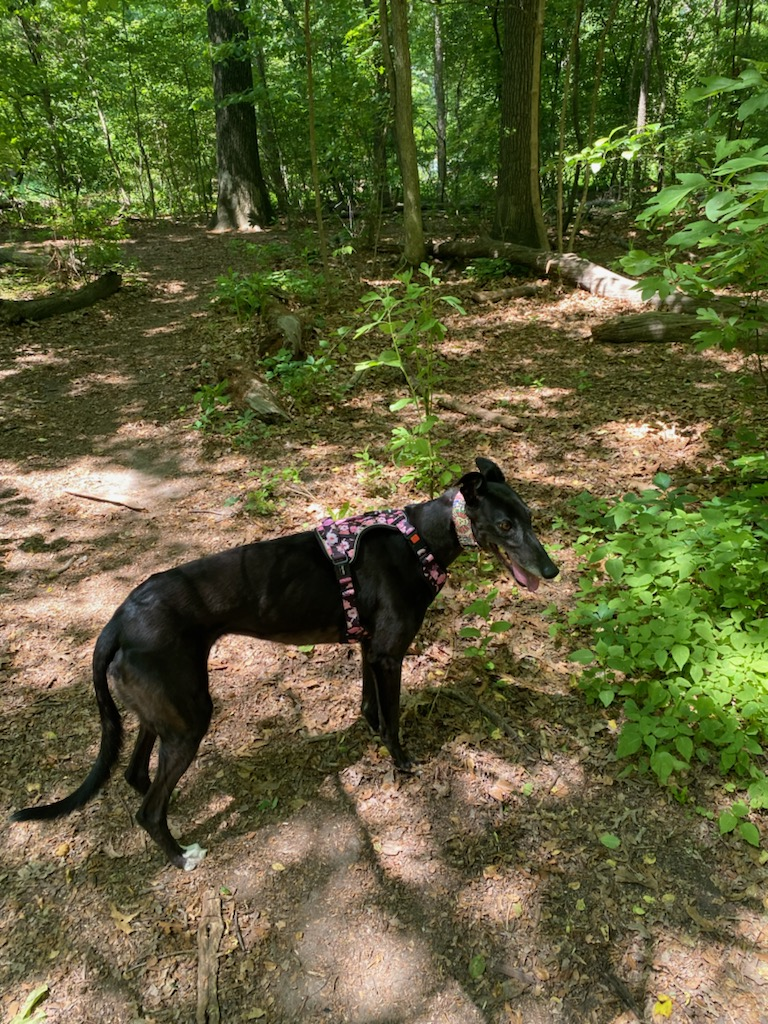
A greyhound walking through the forested area of Timber Creek dog park in Gloucester, New Jersey.

Big Timber Creek flows east to west through the township to the Delaware River. A large enclosed dog park is located near the banks of Big Timber Creek.

== Demographics ==
Historical population
Census	Pop.	Note	%±
1800	1,398		—
1810	1,726		23.5%
1820	2,059		19.3%
1830	2,332		13.3%
1840	2,837	*	21.7%
1850	2,371	*	−16.4%
1860	2,320		−2.2%
1870	2,710		16.8%
1880	2,527		−6.8%
1890	3,091		22.3%
1900	4,018		30.0%
1910	2,380	*	−40.8%
1920	3,097		30.1%
1930	5,820		87.9%
1940	6,198		6.5%
1950	7,952		28.3%
1960	17,591		121.2%
1970	26,511		50.7%
1980	45,156		70.3%
1990	53,797		19.1%
2000	64,350		19.6%
2010	64,634		0.4%
2020	66,034		2.2%
2023 (est.)	66,239		0.3%
Population sources: 1800–1840 1850–2000; 1800–1920 1840 1850–1870; 1850 1870 1880–1890; 1890–1910 1910–1930; 1940–2000 2000; 2010 2020 * = Lost territory in previous decade.

=== 2010 census ===
The 2010 United States census counted 64,634 people, 23,566 households, and 16,873 families in the township. The population density was 2,812.2 per square mile (1,085.8/km^{2}). There were 24,711 housing units at an average density of 1,075.2 per square mile (415.1/km^{2}). The racial makeup was 75.80% (48,993) White, 16.19% (10,464) Black or African American, 0.20% (129) Native American, 3.67% (2,374) Asian, 0.03% (20) Pacific Islander, 1.83% (1,183) from other races, and 2.28% (1,471) from two or more races. Hispanic or Latino of any race were 5.65% (3,650) of the population.

Of the 23,566 households, 32.7% had children under the age of 18; 52.4% were married couples living together; 14.1% had a female householder with no husband present and 28.4% were non-families. Of all households, 22.8% were made up of individuals and 7.3% had someone living alone who was 65 years of age or older. The average household size was 2.73 and the average family size was 3.24.

24.3% of the population were under the age of 18, 9.3% from 18 to 24, 27.1% from 25 to 44, 28.3% from 45 to 64, and 11.0% who were 65 years of age or older. The median age was 37.8 years. For every 100 females, the population had 94.0 males. For every 100 females ages 18 and older there were 90.5 males.

The Census Bureau's 2006–2010 American Community Survey showed that (in 2010 inflation-adjusted dollars) median household income was $72,811 (with a margin of error of +/− $3,131) and the median family income was $82,491 (+/− $2,354). Males had a median income of $55,185 (+/− $1,931) versus $41,697 (+/− $1,505) for females. The per capita income for the township was $29,231 (+/− $984). About 3.5% of families and 5.0% of the population were below the poverty line, including 7.0% of those under age 18 and 3.7% of those age 65 or over.

=== 2000 census ===
As of the 2000 United States census of 2000, there were 64,350 people, 23,150 households, and 16,876 families residing in the township. The population density was 2,771.2 inhabitants per square mile (1,070.0/km^{2}). There were 24,257 housing units at an average density of 1,044.6 per square mile (403.3/km^{2}). The racial makeup of the township was 83.11% White, 11.55% African American, 0.16% Native American, 2.62% Asian, 0.02% Pacific Islander, 1.11% from other races, and 1.42% from two or more races. Hispanic or Latino of any race were 3.05% of the population.

There were 23,150 households, out of which 37.8% had children under the age of 18 living with them, 55.9% were married couples living together, 12.5% had a female householder with no husband present, and 27.1% were non-families. 21.4% of all households were made up of individuals, and 6.2% had someone living alone who was 65 years of age or older. The average household size was 2.75 and the average family size was 3.24.

In the township, the population was spread out, with 26.9% under the age of 18, 8.7% from 18 to 24, 33.0% from 25 to 44, 22.0% from 45 to 64, and 9.4% who were 65 years of age or older. The median age was 35 years. For every 100 females, there were 94.8 males. For every 100 females age 18 and over, there were 90.6 males.

The median income for a household in the township was $54,280, and the median income for a family was $62,992. Males had a median income of $42,451 versus $31,427 for females. The per capita income for the township was $22,604. About 4.4% of families and 6.2% of the population were below the poverty line, including 6.7% of those under age 18 and 5.4% of those age 65 or over.

== Government ==
=== Local government ===
Gloucester Township is governed within the Faulkner Act, formally known as the Optional Municipal Charter Law, under the Mayor-Council system of New Jersey municipal government plan B, as implemented as of July 1, 1982, based on direct petition. The township is one of 71 municipalities (of the 564) statewide that use this form of government. The township's governing body is comprised of the mayor and the seven-member township council, all of whom are elected on an at-large basis in partisan elections to serve four-year terms of office. Either three or four council seats come up for election in odd-numbered years as part of the November general election, with the mayoral seat up for vote the same year that three council seats are up for vote.

As of 2020, the Mayor of Gloucester Township is Democrat David R. Mayer, whose term of office ends December 31, 2021. Members of the Township Council are Council President Orlando Mercado (D, 2023), Council Vice President Tracey L. Trotto (D, 2023), Dan Hutchison (D, 2025), Carolyn Grace (D, 2025), Michael D. Mignone (D, 2023), Andrea L. Stubbs (D, 2023) and Michelle L. Winters (D, 2025).

=== Federal, state and county representation ===
Gloucester Township is located in the 1st Congressional District and is part of New Jersey's 4th state legislative district.

For the 119th United States Congress, New Jersey's 1st congressional district is represented by Donald Norcross (D, Camden). New Jersey is represented in the United States Senate by Democrats Cory Booker (Newark, term ends 2027) and Andy Kim (Moorestown, term ends 2031).

For the 2026–2027 session, the 4th legislative district of the New Jersey Legislature is represented in the State Senate by Paul D. Moriarty (D, Washington Township) and in the General Assembly by Dan Hutchison (D, Gloucester Township) and Cody Miller (D, Monroe Township).

Camden County is governed by a Board of County Commissioners composed of seven members chosen at-large in partisan elections for three-year terms on a staggered basis by the residents of the county, with either two or three seats up for election each year as part of the November general election. At a reorganization meeting held in January after each election, the newly constituted Board of Commissioners selects one member to serve as Director and another as Deputy Director, each serving a one-year term in that role. As of 2025, Camden County's Commissioners are: Commissioner Director Louis Cappelli Jr. (D, Collingswood, 2026), Commissioner Deputy Director Edward T. McDonnell (D, Pennsauken Township, 2025), Virginia Ruiz Betteridge (D, Runnemede, 2025), Almar Dyer (D, Pennsauken Township, 2027), Melinda Kane (D, Cherry Hill, 2027), Jeffrey L. Nash (D, Winslow Township, 2027), and Jonathan L. Young Sr. (D, Berlin Township, 2026).

Camden County's constitutional officers are: Clerk Pamela Rosen Lampitt (D, Cherry Hill, 2029) Sheriff Chuck Billingham (D, Gloucester City, 2027) and Surrogate Michelle Gentek-Mayer (D, Gloucester Township, 2025).

=== Politics ===
As of March 2011, there were a total of 41,873 registered voters in Gloucester Township, of which 16,603 (39.7%) were registered as Democrats, 6,039 (14.4%) were registered as Republicans and 19,205 (45.9%) were registered as Unaffiliated. There were 26 voters registered to other parties.

Gubernatorial election results for Gloucester Township
Year	Republican		Democratic		Third party(ies)	
Year	No.	%	No.	%	No.	%
2025	9,934	37.76%	16,201	61.59%	170	0.65%
2021	9,412	46.20%	10,796	52.99%	164	0.81%
2017	5,598	35.79%	9,723	62.16%	322	2.06%
2013	9,042	59.40%	5,982	39.30%	198	1.30%
2009	7,748	44.23%	8,390	47.89%	1,381	7.88%
2005	6,081	38.20%	9,173	57.62%	666	4.18%

In the 2012 presidential election, Democrat Barack Obama received 63.9% of the vote (18,178 cast), ahead of Republican Mitt Romney with 35.1% (9,999 votes), and other candidates with 1.0% (271 votes), among the 28,615 ballots cast by the township's 45,074 registered voters (167 ballots were spoiled), for a turnout of 63.5%. In the 2008 presidential election, Democrat Barack Obama received 61.3% of the vote (18,601 cast), ahead of Republican John McCain, who received around 35.1% (10,645 votes), with 30,341 ballots cast among the township's 40,565 registered voters, for a turnout of 74.8%. In the 2004 presidential election, Democrat John Kerry received 57.6% of the vote (16,318 ballots cast), outpolling Republican George W. Bush, who received around 40.7% (11,529 votes), with 28,323 ballots cast among the township's 38,229 registered voters, for a turnout percentage of 74.1.

United States presidential election results for Gloucester Township
Year	Republican		Democratic		Third party(ies)	
Year	No.	%	No.	%	No.	%
2024	14,186	41.75%	19,313	56.84%	480	1.41%
2020	13,926	39.26%	21,132	59.57%	416	1.17%
2016	11,843	40.24%	16,673	56.65%	918	3.12%
2012	9,999	35.15%	18,178	63.90%	271	0.95%
2008	10,645	35.08%	18,601	61.31%	1,095	3.61%
2004	11,529	40.71%	16,318	57.61%	476	1.68%

In the 2013 gubernatorial election, Republican Chris Christie received 59.4% of the vote (9,042 cast), ahead of Democrat Barbara Buono with 39.3% (5,982 votes), and other candidates with 1.3% (198 votes), among the 15,693 ballots cast by the township's 45,408 registered voters (471 ballots were spoiled), for a turnout of 34.6%. In the 2009 gubernatorial election, Democrat Jon Corzine received 47.9% of the vote (8,390 ballots cast), ahead of both Republican Chris Christie with 44.2% (7,748 votes) and Independent Chris Daggett with 4.8% (839 votes), with 17,519 ballots cast among the township's 41,329 registered voters, yielding a 42.4% turnout.

United States Senate election results for Gloucester Township1
Year	Republican		Democratic		Third party(ies)	
Year	No.	%	No.	%	No.	%
2024	12,915	39.29%	19,512	59.36%	446	1.36%
2018	9,290	40.85%	12,322	54.19%	1,128	4.96%
2012	8,869	32.84%	17,838	66.05%	298	1.10%
2006	6,225	39.10%	9,391	58.98%	306	1.92%

United States Senate election results for Gloucester Township2
Year	Republican		Democratic		Third party(ies)	
Year	No.	%	No.	%	No.	%
2020	13,671	39.02%	21,021	60.00%	345	0.98%
2014	5,082	38.08%	8,072	60.48%	193	1.45%
2013	3,405	39.22%	5,166	59.50%	111	1.28%
2008	9,690	35.36%	17,369	63.37%	348	1.27%

== Education ==
The Gloucester Township Public Schools system, serves students in pre-kindergarten through eighth grade. The district operates eight PreK/K–5 elementary schools and three grade 6–8 middle schools, including the Ann A. Mullen Middle School, dedicated in September 1996 and named in honor of former mayor Ann A. Mullen. As of the 2020–21 school year, the district, comprised of 11 schools, had an enrollment of 6,481 students and 534.3 classroom teachers (on an FTE basis), for a student–teacher ratio of 12.1:1. Schools in the district (with 2020–21 enrollment data from the National Center for Education Statistics) are Blackwood Elementary School (581 students; in grades PreK–5), Chews Elementary School (662; PreK–5), Erial Elementary School (650; PreK–5), Glendora Elementary School (232; K–5), Gloucester Township Elementary School (252; K–5), James W. Lilley Jr. Elementary School (494; K–5), Loring-Flemming Elementary School (651; K–5), Union Valley Elementary School (476; K–5), Glen Landing Middle School (657; 6–8), Charles W. Lewis Middle School (657; 6–8) and Ann A. Mullen Middle School (919; 6–8).

Students in public school for ninth through twelfth grades attend one of the three high schools that are part of the Black Horse Pike Regional School District. The schools in the district (with 2020–2021 enrollment data from the National Center for Education Statistics) are Highland Regional High School (1,188 students; located in Blackwood), Timber Creek Regional High School (1,187; Erial) or Triton Regional High School (1,103; Runnemede). Students from Gloucester Township attend one of the three schools based on their residence address; students from Bellmawr and Runnemede, the other two communities in the district, all attend Triton High School. Seats on the high school district's nine-member board of education are allocated based on the population of the constituent municipalities, with seven seats assigned to Gloucester Township.

Gloucester Township Technical High School is a countywide vocational school that offers day and evening classes.

The Kingdom Charter School of Leadership was a charter school that served students in kindergarten through sixth grade residing in Gloucester Township, who were accepted by lottery on a space-available basis. The school surrendered its charter and ceased operations in June 2019.

Our Lady of Hope Regional School is a Roman Catholic elementary school that operates under the auspices of the Roman Catholic Diocese of Camden. Our Lady of Hope Regional School was renamed following the 2008 merger of St. Jude's Regional School with St. Agnes School.

Camden County College is located in Blackwood, on a 320 acres (130 ha) campus that had been acquired in 1967. The school's first students started attending in 1968 and the campus has undergone an $83 million expansion and renovation project that started in 2005. Over 44 programs of study ranging from allied health to engineering technology and science, laser and optics, public safety, business administration, liberal arts, human services and secretarial studies are available. Other programs include a GED center, self-enrichment and senior adult courses. Evening and weekend classes, including computer programming are offered. Local residents may use the college's learning resource center to receive dental hygiene clinic services.

== Transportation ==
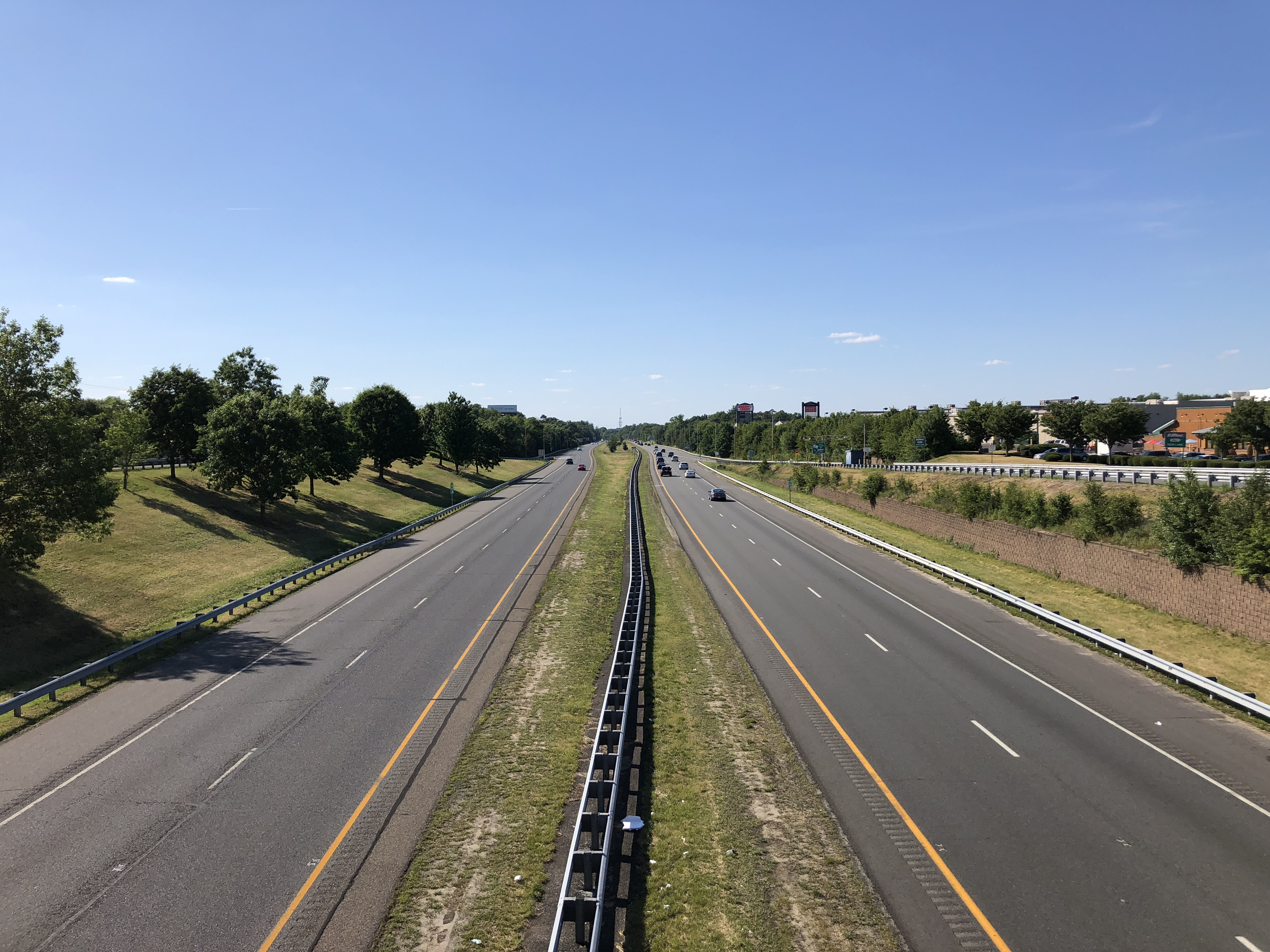
The westbound Atlantic City Expressway in Gloucester Township

=== Roads and highways ===
As of May 2010, the township had a total of 239.44 miles (385.34 km) of roadways, of which 186.25 miles (299.74 km) were maintained by the municipality, 41.69 miles (67.09 km) by Camden County, 9.10 miles (14.65 km) by the New Jersey Department of Transportation and 2.40 miles (3.86 km) by the South Jersey Transportation Authority.

The Atlantic City Expressway is the most prominent highway in Gloucester Township, passing through the southwestern portion of the township. Route 41 clips the northwestern tip very briefly while Route 42 and Route 168 both pass through the township in the western part. CR 534 travels through the center while CR 544 runs along the northern border.

=== Public transportation ===
NJ Transit bus service between the township and Philadelphia is provided on the 400 route, with local service available on the 403 and 459 routes.

== Notable people ==
People who were born in, residents of, or otherwise closely associated with Gloucester Township include:

- Jersey Bakley (1864–1915), was a Major League Baseball pitcher who was 19 years old when he broke into the big leagues in 1883 with the Philadelphia Athletics
- Damiere Byrd (born 1993), wide receiver for the Atlanta Falcons of the National Football League
- Jihaad Campbell (born 2004), linebacker for the Philadelphia Eagles
- Nick Comoroto (born 1991), professional wrestler known for his appearances with the professional wrestling promotions WWE and All Elite Wrestling
- Mike Daniels (born 1989), defensive end for the Green Bay Packers
- John A. Dramesi (1933–2017), prisoner of war who had been held by the Viet Cong in the Hanoi Hilton
- Kyle Hines (born 1986), professional basketball player who was the 6th player in NCAA history to amass 2,000 points, 1,000 rebounds and 300 blocks in a career
- Dan Hutchison, attorney and politician serving as a member of the New Jersey General Assembly for the 4th legislative district, since taking office on January 9, 2024
- Jim Jackson (born 1963), sportscaster for the Philadelphia Phillies and Philadelphia Flyers
- Hugh A. Kelly Jr. (1923/24–1999), politician who served in the New Jersey Senate for a single term representing District 3B
- Sandra Love (born 1945), served as a member of the New Jersey General Assembly from 2008 to 2010 and was Gloucester Township's mayor from 1994 to 2006
- David R. Mayer (born 1967), Mayor of Gloucester Township who served in the New Jersey General Assembly from 2002 to 2008
- Lyle and Erik Menendez (born 1968 and 1970), convicted murderers
- Joseph Menna (born 1974), sculptor
- Jeff Moore (born 1980), retired soccer player
- Gabriela Mosquera (born 1977), politician, who has served in the New Jersey General Assembly since 2012, where she represents the 4th Legislative District
- Ann A. Mullen (1935–1994), politician who served in the New Jersey General Assembly and as mayor of Gloucester Township
- Ray Narleski (1928–2012), relief pitcher in Major League Baseball who played with the Cleveland Indians (1954–1958) and Detroit Tigers (1959)
- Billy Paul (1934–2016), Grammy Award-winning soul singer
- A. Raymond Randolph (born 1943), federal judge on the United States Court of Appeals for the District of Columbia Circuit who was appointed to the court in 1990
- Lisa Regina (born c. 1961), actress, screenwriter, director and acting coach
- Dennis L. Riley (born 1945), politician who served in the New Jersey General Assembly, where he represented the 4th Legislative District from 1980 to 1990
- Joe Vitt (born 1954), interim head coach of the New Orleans Saints
