= Lynda Lee-Potter =

British journalist

Lynda Lee-Potter OBE
- Born: Lynda Higginson; 2 May 1935; Leigh, Lancashire, England
- Died: 20 October 2004 (aged 69); Wareham, Dorset, England
- Spouse: Jeremy Lee-Potter (m. 1957)
- Children: 3

Lynda Lee-Potter OBE (née Higginson; 2 May 1935 – 20 October 2004) was a British journalist. She was best known as a columnist for the Daily Mail.

== Early years ==
Lynda Higginson was born into a working-class family in the mining town of Leigh, Lancashire. Her father, Norman, was a miner who would later turn to painting and decorating, while her mother, Margaret (née Berry) worked in a shoe shop; Lynda won a place at Leigh Girls' Grammar School, which she described as "the escape route for ordinary children and the pathway to a new life". Her first ambition was to become an actress and, aged 18, she went to London to attend the Guildhall School of Music and Drama, later telling friends that she lost her Lancashire accent on the train down. After leaving the Guildhall School, and using the stage name Lynda Berrison, she won a part in one of Brian Rix's farces at the Whitehall Theatre.

Higginson's life changed when she met Jeremy Lee-Potter, the son of Air Marshal Sir Patrick Lee-Potter, who was then a medical student at Guy's Hospital. They married in December 1957, after which he was posted to Aden, as an RAF doctor. While living there, she began her career as a journalist, writing articles for the Aden Chronicle about life as an expatriate. Her husband became an eminent consultant haematologist, based at Poole Hospital, chairman of the Council of the British Medical Association from 1990 to 1993 and the deputy chairman of the professional conduct committee of the General Medical Council.

== Daily Mail ==
She joined the Daily Mail as a feature writer in 1967, but her big break came five years later, when Jean Rook left the Daily Mail for the Daily Express. Lee-Potter recalled: "I remember I had the day off, and our features editor phoned up and said: 'the editor (David English) wants you to come in and do a column,' and I said 'Oh, right'. I went in and did it. Every week I thought somebody else would probably take over. But it's just carried on."

One journalist who was given the job of interviewing her reported:

It is difficult when approaching Lee-Potter to know if you will be getting the columnist or the affable interviewer. Questions about her views are deftly parried, and turned into questions about yours. Within 10 minutes of our meeting, she had determined my marital status, number of children, place of residence, so on and so forth.

== Class Act ==
In 2000, she wrote a book called Class Act: How to Beat the British Class System. In the book, she declared that "people may well sneer at me for writing a book about class", she declared. "Others will say that nobody called Lynda from a working-class background has any right to pontificate on the subject. Actually, I can't think of anybody better equipped, having probably trawled my way through more classes than most".

The book offered aperçus such as "upper middle-class mummies have little trouble with au pairs because they are naturally authoritative" and "the lower middle-classes desperately want to be dainty", and dispensed advice, such as what to take your hostess at country house weekends: "Under no circumstances take a poinsettia, which is the plant equivalent of a bottle of Blue Nun."

She made no apology for her interest in the subject: "The only people who hanker after a classless society are those who want what other people have without working for it". Snobbery, she said, "will always be with us", adding: "It has certainly motivated me all my life. I may be ridiculous, but I don't care."

== Awards ==
Lee-Potter was appointed an Officer of the Order of the British Empire in the 1998 New Year Honours for services to journalism and for charitable services. She was named Columnist of the Year in 1984 and 2001, Feature Writer of the Year in 1987 and 1993, and Woman Writer of the Year in 1989.

== Illness and death ==
On 20 October 2004, Lee-Potter died from a brain tumour. She was survived by her husband and three children, all of whom followed their mother into journalism.

== See also ==
- List of notable brain tumor patients
