= Glenda Slagg =

Fictional parodic columnist in Private Eye magazine

Glenda Slagg is a fictional parodic columnist in the British satirical magazine Private Eye. She first appeared in the mid-1960s. Slagg's writing style is a pastiche of several female columnists in British newspapers, notably Jean Rook and Lynda Lee-Potter. Slagg is depicted as brash, vitriolic, and inconsistent. She has become an archetype of British journalism.

Slagg's column usually takes the form of several paragraphs lauding people in the news that fortnight, each followed by a paragraph deriding the people she has just praised. For example, she will begin "Hats off to Anne Robinson!" and follow it later with "Anne Robinson? Aren'tchajustsickofher!" Slagg finishes her column by listing, with heavy sexual innuendo, the men in the news she finds attractive that week, often using a variation on her catchphrase "Crazy name, crazy guy!?!" before signing off with "Byeeeee!!!!".

Her characteristic style also includes overuse of exclamation marks and question marks, and saying "Geddit!!??!" whenever she makes a joke. She is often fired and rehired by "Ed" ( the editor) in the space of a paragraph.
