= Richard Randerson =

New Zealand Anglican bishop

John Richard Randerson CNZM (born 1940) is a New Zealand Anglican cleric who served as Dean of Holy Trinity Cathedral, Auckland from 2000 to 2007. He was also Vicar-General, from 1999, and Assistant Bishop of the Anglican Diocese of Auckland in the Anglican Church in Aotearoa, New Zealand and Polynesia from 2002.

== Early life and education ==
Randerson was born in Takapuna in 1940.

He received degrees of BA and MA(Hons) (1961) and BD (1964) from the University of Otago, STM (1969) from the Union Theological Seminary, New York, and DMin (1987) from the San Francisco Theological Seminary, Berkeley.

== Career ==
Randerson was ordained a deacon in 1964, and ordained a priest in 1965; he was consecrated a bishop on 21 December 1994, and served as Assistant Bishop of Canberra and Goulburn in the Diocese of Canberra, 1994–1999, in the Province of New South Wales, of the Anglican Church of Australia. On his leaving to return to New Zealand, Brendan Smyth, the ACT Minister for Urban Services, made a Speech of Commendation in the Legislative Assembly describing Bishop Randerson's contribution to the State.

He has written two publications about Christianity and market-based economic ideology; Christian Ethics and the New Zealand Economy published in 1987, and Hearts and Minds: a place for people in a market economy published in 1992. A third book, A Word in Season: Reflections on spirituality, faith and ethics, was published in 2008.

Randerson has contributed to the development of government policy in New Zealand. He was a member of the Royal Commission on Genetic Modification, from 2000 to 2001. He was among a group of church leaders who supported the 2007 repeal of Section 59 of the Crimes Act, the section of the act that allowed New Zealand parents and guardians to use force against children in certain circumstances. In 2011 he served as Deputy Chair on New Zealand's Advisory Committee on Assisted Reproductive Technology, also known as 'ACART'.

In 2007 he attracted controversy for expressing concern for the well-being of patients in a proposed health workers' strike. He also attracted controversy for stating that as he did not believe God's existence could be scientifically proved, he could be considered an agnostic from a scientific perspective. His comments were interpreted in some quarters as an admission that he himself doubted the existence of God.

== Personal life ==
Randerson is married with three children, including the playwright Jo Randerson. His brother, Tony Randerson, is a judge to the Court of Appeal of New Zealand.

== Honours and awards ==
In the 2004 Queen's Birthday Honours, Randerson was appointed a Companion of the New Zealand Order of Merit, for services to the community.
