= Glenda Goertzen =

Canadian writer

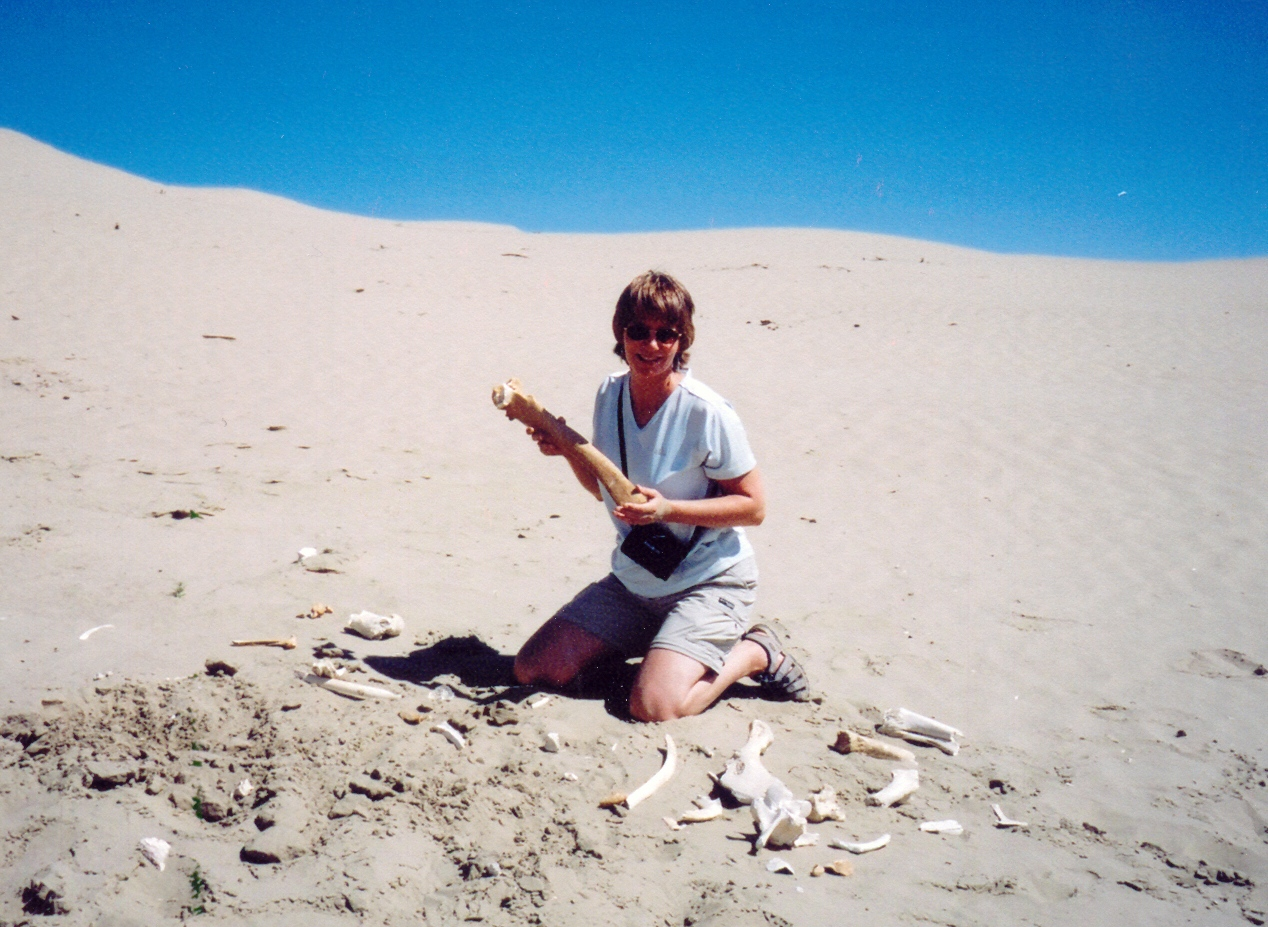
- Glenda Goertzen in the Great Sandhills of Saskatchewan, Canada
- Born: 1967 (age 58–59) Morse, Saskatchewan
- Occupation: Author
- Genre: Fantasy; science fiction; children's literature; young adult fiction

Glenda Goertzen (born 1967) is a Canadian author of children's and young adult fantasy, including the children's novel The Prairie Dogs.

== Life and work ==
Goertzen wrote the first draft of The Prairie Dogs while she was in high school. She got a degree in Film and Video at the University of Regina and worked as a computer graphics and animation artist, then went to work for CKTV Regina in a variety of technical positions.

In 1998, she moved to Saskatoon to take the Library and Information Program at SIAST, where she completed The Prairie Dogs. Shortly after moving to Prince Albert, Saskatchewan in 2005, The Prairie Dogs was published by Fitzhenry & Whiteside. Goerten published City Dogs in 2007, Miracle Dogs in 2012, and Lady Oak Abroad in 2014.

== Bibliography ==
- The Prairie Dogs (2005), ISBN 978-1-55005113-1
- City Dogs (2007), ISBN 978-1-55455005-0
- Miracle Dogs (2012), ISBN 978-0-98792320-2
- Lady Oak Abroad (2014) ISBN 978-0-98792321-9 (eBook) ISBN 978-0-98792322-6 (print)

== Awards ==
- 2005 Saskatchewan Book Award shortlist for The Prairie Dogs
- 2006 Ontario Library Association Silver Birch Award shortlist for The Prairie Dogs
- 2006/2007 Saskatchewan Young Readers' Choice Diamond Willow Award shortlist for The Prairie Dogs
- 2007 Saskatchewan Book Award shortlist for City Dogs
- 2008 Canadian Children's Book Centre's Best Books for Kids & Teens, City Dogs
