= Blenheim, New Jersey =

Populated place in Camden County, New Jersey, US

- Unincorporated community
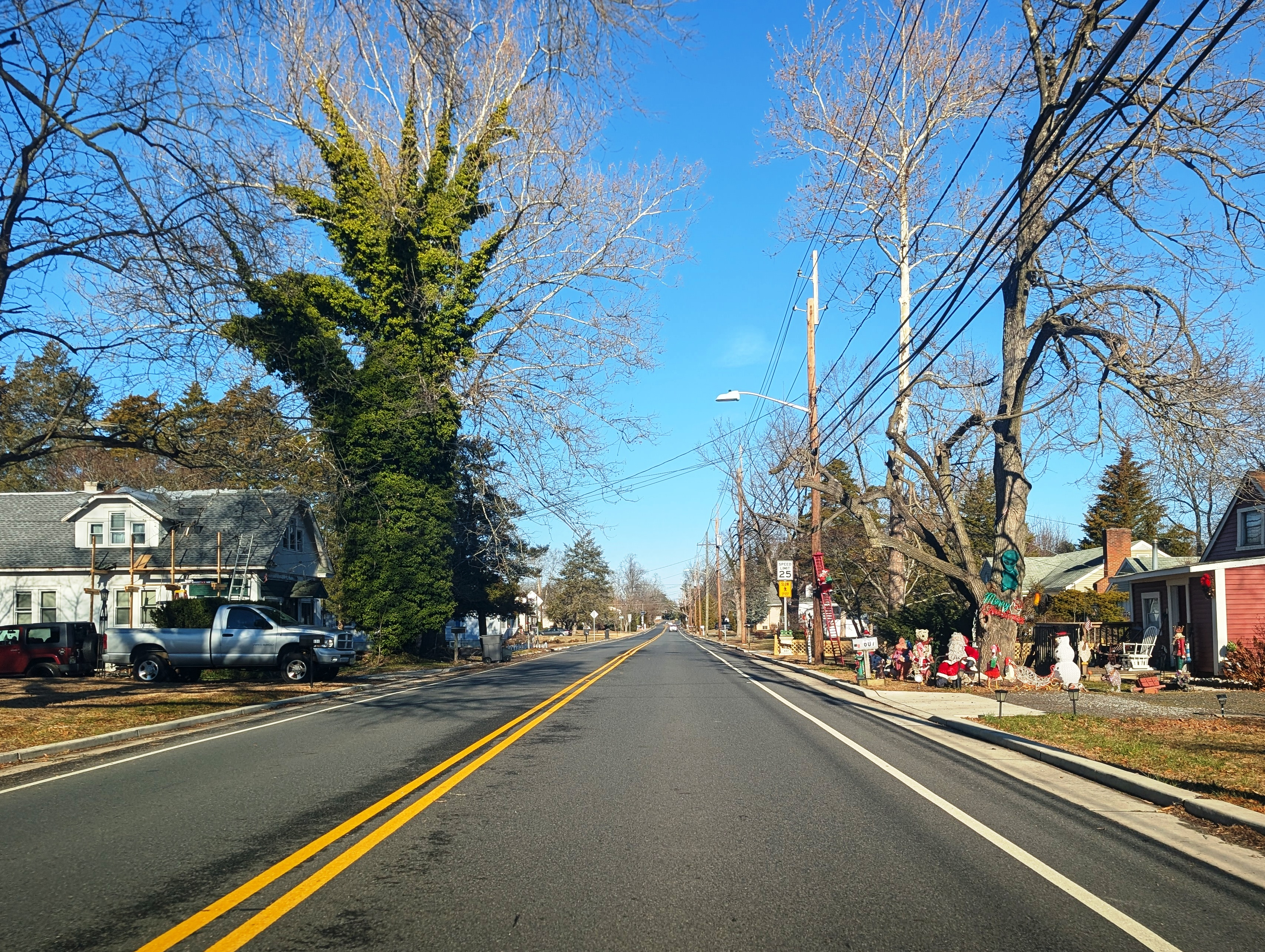
- CR 681 in Blenheim

- Location in Camden County (Inset: Camden County in New Jersey) Blenheim (New Jersey) Blenheim (the United States)
- Coordinates: 39°48′33″N 75°04′39″W
- Country: United States
- State: New Jersey
- County: Camden
- Township: Gloucester
- Named for: Blenheim, Germany
- Elevation: 52 ft (16 m)
- Time zone: UTC−05:00 (Eastern (EST))
  - Summer (DST): UTC−04:00 (EDT)
- Area code: 856
- GNIS feature ID: 874809

Blenheim is an unincorporated community located within Gloucester Township, in Camden County, in the U.S. state of New Jersey. Blenheim contributed to the township's early growth, as well as the nearby communities of Erial and Sicklerville.

Blenheim is named after Blenheim, Germany.
