= Tony Randerson =

New Zealand judge

The Honourable Tony Randerson CNZM KC
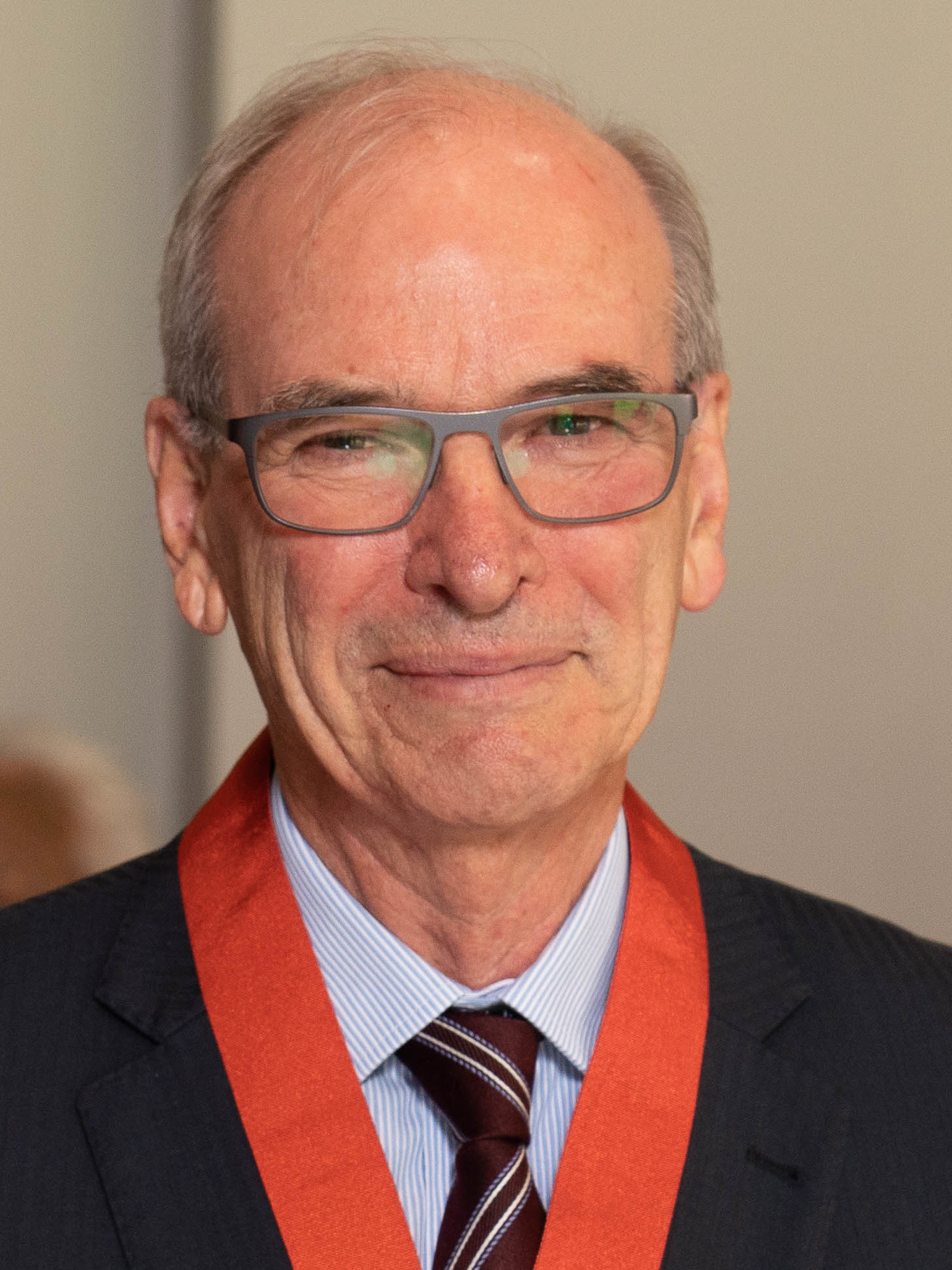
- Randerson in 2021

Justice of the Court of Appeal
- In office February 2010 – May 2017

Personal details
- Born: Anthony Penrose Randerson; 1947 (age 78–79)
- Spouse: Glenda Randerson
- Relatives: Richard Randerson (brother); Jo Randerson (niece)

Anthony Penrose Randerson CNZM KC (born 1947) is a New Zealand retired jurist. In 1990/91, he chaired the group that considered Geoffrey Palmer's bill that became the Resource Management Act 1991 (RMA). In 2019/20, he chaired the group that recommended for the RMA to be abolished.

== Biography ==
Randerson was born in 1947, the youngest of three boys. His parents were Brian Randerson (1910–1987) and Ngaio (née Penrose; 1911–2000). His eldest brother is bishop Richard Randerson (born 1940), former Dean of Holy Trinity Cathedral, Auckland. His middle brother, Michael Randerson (1942–1975), was a banker but died young.

Randerson graduated from the University of Auckland in 1969 with a Bachelor of Laws. In 1972, he became a partner in the firm Wallace McLean, where he worked with and for John Wallace. From 1989, he was a barrister sole.

In 1990, he chaired a review group for Simon Upton that finalised the Resource Management Act 1991. Randerson was appointed to the High Court in 1997.

He was appointed New Zealand Chief High Court Judge on 16 December 2004. He was subsequently appointed to the Court of Appeal of New Zealand with effect from 1 February 2010, and retired as the longest serving judge of that court in May 2017. From July 2019, he chaired the Resource Management Review Panel on behalf of the government. The panel recommended for the RMA to be scrapped, and replaced with three acts: Natural and Built Environments Act (NBA), Spatial Planning Act (SPA), and Climate Change Adaptation Act (CAA).

== Honours and awards ==
Randerson was appointed a Queen's Counsel on 27 May 1996. In the 2021 New Year Honours, he was appointed a Companion of the New Zealand Order of Merit, for services to the judiciary.

== See also ==
- List of King's and Queen's Counsel in New Zealand
