= Glenda (musician) =

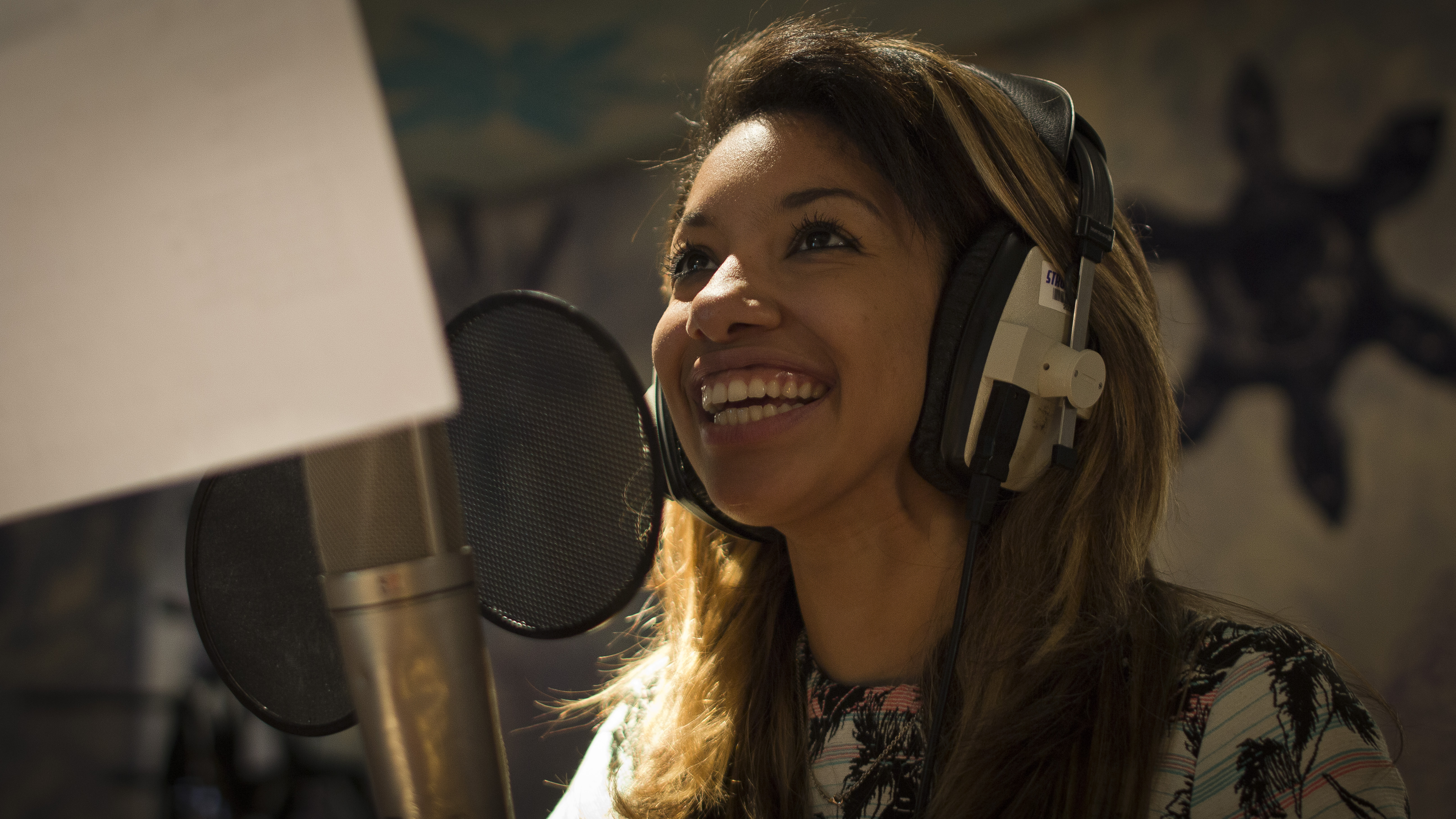

Background information
- Born: September 3, 1988 (age 37)
- Origin: Havana, Cuba
- Genres: Jazz, pop
- Occupations: Musician, composer, singer
- Instruments: Vocals, flute
- Years active: 2012–present
- Website: www.iamglenda.com

Glenda López Exposito (born September 3, 1988), better known by her stage name Glenda, is a Cuban-born singer, songwriter and flute player. She was born in Havana, Cuba into a musical family. Her mother, Bellita (born 1957), is a well-known jazz pianist and singer. Glenda's mother shares her interest in music and Glenda cites her mother as a powerful influence who encouraged her musical expansion. She started attend musical lessons (piano, singing) at the age of 5. Later, she studied at music school of Alejandro García Caturla and from 2003 on Conservatory Amadeo Roldán, both in Havana. She also performed with Orquesta de Flauta, led by influential flute player José Luis Cortéz and in Sinfónica de la Habana as a first flute player.

== Musical beginnings and personal life ==
As teenager, Glenda performed not only in her native country, but also abroad, for example on jazz festival Jazz de Puerto Plata in Dominican Republic or Jazz on the Green Festival in Trinidad a Tobago in 2008 She became a permanent member of band Bellity y Jazztumbata after she graduated on Conservatory Amadeo Roldán in 2007. In June 2011, she got married with Slovak producer Jozef Poláček and started to live also in Slovakia. In November 2011, her son Joshua was born.

From 2012 to 2013 she was performing in original musical Just Dance in Bratislava and appeared on few local festivals, including Cherchez La Femme, Uprising reggae festival or BA City Beats, where Katy B, Wyclef Jean, Aloe Blacc, Rudimental, Hadouken!, Danko Jones and many more artists also performed. She was a guests on concerts for notable Slovak jazz singer Peter Lipa several times. She also cooperated with many others local jazz musicians, for example Martin Valihora, Michal Bugala, Juraj Griglák or Eugen Vizváry. She also contributed on Bellita's album "Lagrimas Negras", which was released in 2013 as promo only record. Glenda's musical inspirations include Esperanza Spalding, Jamie Cullum, and Laura Mvula.

== Performing with Jamie Cullum and The Dead Daisies ==
One of her most memorable moments came in June 2014, when she appeared as guest on Jamie Cullum's solo show in AEGON arena NTC in Bratislava. A few months later she performed on Bratislava jazz days, the oldest jazz festival in Slovakia, with her mother Bellita. According to report from daily newspaper, Pravda, their performance was one of the best at the 40th edition of festival. Another memorable moment for her came in February 2015, when she appeared on stage with former members of Guns N' Roses and Whitesnake, which has formed supergroup The Dead Daisies. Guitarist Richard Fortus, bassist Marco Mendoza, keyboardist Dizzy Reed, guitarist David Lowy, and drummer Brian Tichy performed on February 28 together with Darryl Jones, John Corabi and Bernard Fowler at the Salon Rosado de la Tropical in Havana. Glenda was their special guest and performed two songs with them including The Rolling Stone's "Sympathy for the Devil."

== Cooperation with Danton Supple and Alan Roy Scott ==
Glenda is now being produced by Danton Supple and co-writing/collaborating with former Motown Music veteran Alan Roy Scott. They prepared Glenda's debut LP in Havana at Abdala Studios, where Buena Vista Social Club recorded their albums. Glenda's first single from the resulting album, "In Search Of," was released in November 2014.
