= Glendora, New Jersey =

Populated place in Camden County, New Jersey, US

- Census-designated place
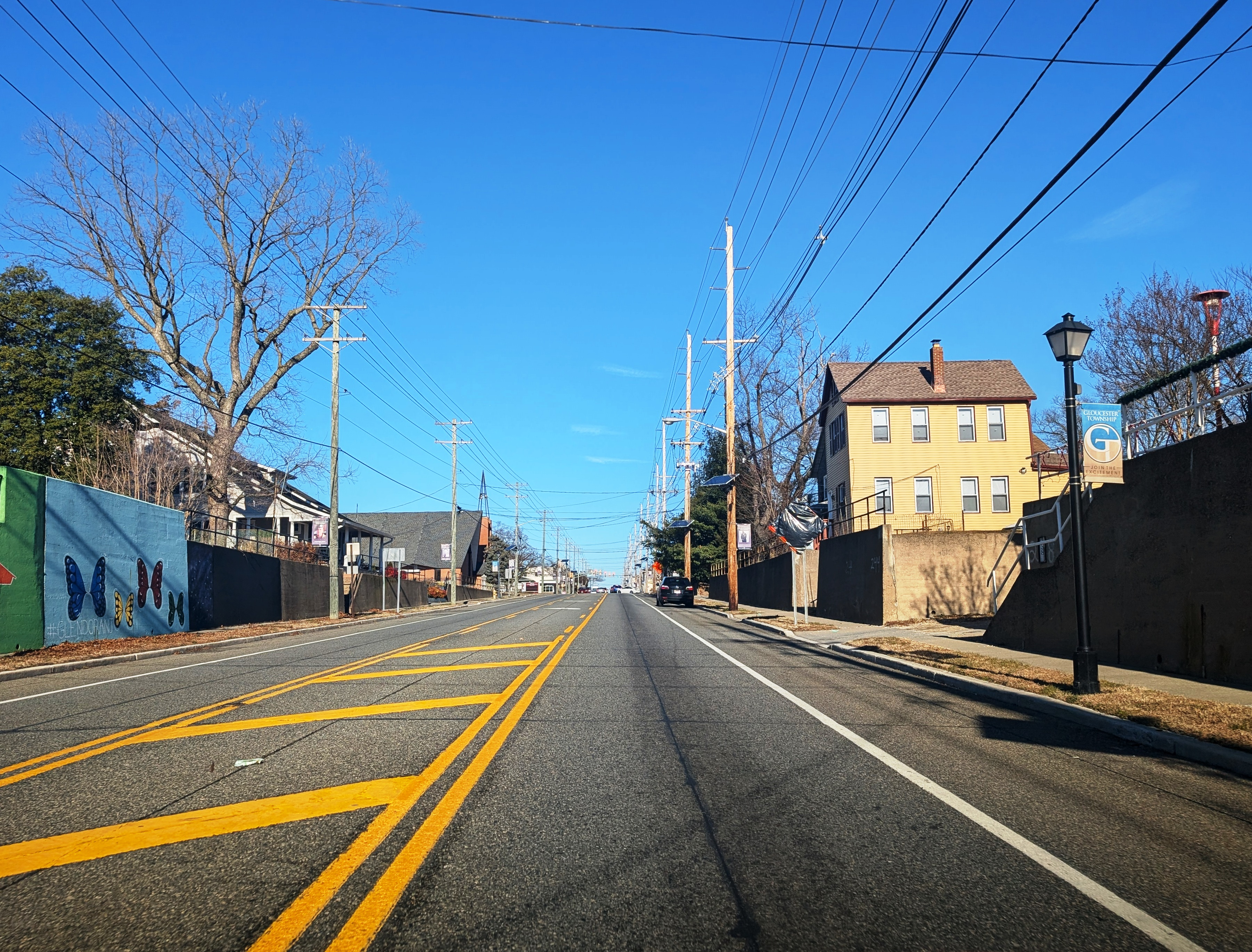
- Route 168 (Black Horse Pike) northbound through Glendora

- Map of Glendora CDP in Camden County. Inset: Location of Camden County within New Jersey.

- Location in Camden County Location in New Jersey Location in the United States
- Coordinates: 39.840937°N 75.067211°W
- Country: United States
- State: New Jersey
- County: Camden
- Township: Gloucester

Area
  - Total: 1.06 sq mi (2.75 km^{2})
  - Land: 1.04 sq mi (2.69 km^{2})
  - Water: 0.023 sq mi (0.06 km^{2}) 2.04%
- Elevation: 79 ft (24 m)

Population (2020)
  - Total: 4,784
  - Density: 4,597.8/sq mi (1,775.22/km^{2})
- Time zone: UTC−05:00 (Eastern (EST))
  - Summer (DST): UTC−04:00 (Eastern (EDT))
- ZIP Code: 08029
- Area code: 856
- FIPS code: 34-26520
- GNIS feature ID: 02389851

Glendora is an unincorporated community and census-designated place (CDP) located within Gloucester Township, in Camden County, in the U.S. state of New Jersey. As of the 2020 census, Glendora had a population of 4,784.

== Geography ==
According to the United States Census Bureau, the CDP had a total area of 1.062 square miles (2.75 km^{2}), including 1.040 square miles (2.69 km^{2}) of land and 0.022 square miles (0.057 km^{2}) of water (2.04%).

It is home to the unusual Cookie Jar House, constructed in the 1940s and described as "One of N.J.'s oddest homes".

== Demographics ==
Historical population
Census	Pop.	Note	%±
1980	5,632		—
1990	5,201		−7.7%
2000	4,907		−5.7%
2010	4,750		−3.2%
2020	4,784		0.7%
Population sources: 1950 1960 1970; 1980 1990 2000; 2010 2020

Glendora first appeared as a census designated place in the 1980 U.S. census.

=== Racial and ethnic composition ===
Glendora CDP, New Jersey – Racial and ethnic composition Note: the US Census treats Hispanic/Latino as an ethnic category. This table excludes Latinos from the racial categories and assigns them to a separate category. Hispanics/Latinos may be of any race.
Race / Ethnicity (NH = Non-Hispanic)	Pop 2000	Pop 2010	Pop 2020	% 2000	% 2010	% 2020
White alone (NH)	4,739	4,367	3,935	96.58%	91.94%	82.25%
Black or African American alone (NH)	25	69	164	0.51%	1.45%	3.43%
Native American or Alaska Native alone (NH)	6	5	3	0.12%	0.11%	0.06%
Asian alone (NH)	16	31	93	0.33%	0.65%	1.94%
Native Hawaiian or Pacific Islander alone (NH)	1	0	0	0.02%	0.00%	0.00%
Other race alone (NH)	2	9	17	0.04%	0.19%	0.36%
Mixed race or Multiracial (NH)	41	48	158	0.84%	1.01%	3.30%
Hispanic or Latino (any race)	77	221	414	1.57%	4.65%	8.65%
Total	4,907	4,750	4,784	100.00%	100.00%	100.00%

=== 2020 census ===
As of the 2020 census, Glendora had a population of 4,784. The median age was 43.8 years. 17.9% of residents were under the age of 18 and 21.2% of residents were 65 years of age or older. For every 100 females there were 90.9 males, and for every 100 females age 18 and over there were 88.1 males age 18 and over.

100.0% of residents lived in urban areas, while 0.0% lived in rural areas.

There were 1,969 households in Glendora, of which 27.7% had children under the age of 18 living in them. Of all households, 43.1% were married-couple households, 15.5% were households with a male householder and no spouse or partner present, and 32.3% were households with a female householder and no spouse or partner present. About 32.0% of all households were made up of individuals and 20.1% had someone living alone who was 65 years of age or older.

There were 2,056 housing units, of which 4.2% were vacant. The homeowner vacancy rate was 2.1% and the rental vacancy rate was 1.3%.

=== 2010 census ===
The 2010 United States census counted 4,750 people, 1,900 households, and 1,231 families in the CDP. The population density was 4,565.1 people per square mile (1,762.6 people/km^{2}). There were 1,976 housing units at an average density of 1,899.1 units per square mile (733.2 units/km^{2}). The racial makeup was 94.69% (4,498) White, 1.45% (69) Black or African American, 0.11% (5) Native American, 0.65% (31) Asian, 0.00% (0) Pacific Islander, 1.66% (79) from other races, and 1.43% (68) from two or more races. Hispanic or Latino of any race were 4.65% (221) of the population.

Of the 1,900 households, 26.1% had children under the age of 18; 48.9% were married couples living together; 11.4% had a female householder with no husband present and 35.2% were non-families. Of all households, 30.1% were made up of individuals and 17.9% had someone living alone who was 65 years of age or older. The average household size was 2.50 and the average family size was 3.11.

20.9% of the population were under the age of 18, 7.4% from 18 to 24, 25.9% from 25 to 44, 28.0% from 45 to 64, and 17.9% who were 65 years of age or older. The median age was 42.0 years. For every 100 females, the population had 90.5 males. For every 100 females ages 18 and older there were 87.9 males.

=== 2000 census ===
As of the 2000 United States census there were 4,907 people, 1,944 households, and 1,294 families living in the CDP. The population density was 1,770.7 people/km^{2} (4,586 people/mi^{2}). There were 1,997 housing units at an average density of 720.6 units/km^{2} (1,866 units/mi^{2}). The racial makeup of the CDP was 97.55% White, 0.51% African American, 0.16% Native American, 0.33% Asian, 0.02% Pacific Islander, 0.43% from other races, and 1.00% from two or more races. Hispanic or Latino of any race were 1.57% of the population.

There were 1,944 households, out of which 26.5% had children under the age of 18 living with them, 52.9% were married couples living together, 10.0% had a female householder with no husband present, and 33.4% were non-families. 29.8% of all households were made up of individuals, and 19.1% had someone living alone who was 65 years of age or older. The average household size was 2.52 and the average family size was 3.17.

In the CDP the population was spread out, with 21.5% under the age of 18, 7.3% from 18 to 24, 28.5% from 25 to 44, 22.4% from 45 to 64, and 20.3% who were 65 years of age or older. The median age was 40 years. For every 100 females, there were 88.7 males. For every 100 females age 18 and over, there were 82.6 males.

The median income for a household in the CDP was $42,801, and the median income for a family was $51,989. Males had a median income of $39,389 versus $29,334 for females. The per capita income for the CDP was $21,089. About 3.4% of families and 6.4% of the population were below the poverty line, including 6.0% of those under age 18 and 11.5% of those age 65 or over.

== Notable people ==
People who were born in, residents of, or otherwise closely associated with Glendora include:

- A. Raymond Randolph (born 1943), federal judge on the United States Court of Appeals for the District of Columbia Circuit who was appointed to the court in 1990
