= Glenda Randerson =

New Zealand painter (born 1949)

Glenda Dorothy Randerson (born 1949) is a New Zealand painter. Her art is held in the permanent collection of Auckland Art Gallery Toi o Tāmaki.

== Life ==
Randerson studied at the Elam School of Fine Arts in Auckland under Colin McCahon and began exhibiting in 1975. Her early paintings were still lifes and domestic interiors, although later in her career she also painted figures. In the 1990s Randerson completed a series of portraits of New Zealand writers, including Joy Cowley and Stevan Eldred-Grigg.

She is the wife of former Court of Appeal judge Tony Randerson.
