= Gwen =

Gwen may refer to:

- Gwen (given name), including a list of people with the name
- Gwen, or the Book of Sand, a 1985 animated film
- Gwen (film), a 2018 horror film
- Gwen (restaurant), a Michelin-starred restaurant in Hollywood, California
- Tropical Storm Gwen, several storms with the name

== Acronyms ==
- AN/URC-117 Ground Wave Emergency Network, a military command and control communications system
- Guild Wars: Eye of the North (GW:EN), an expansion pack for a massively multiplayer online role-playing game

== See also ==
- Gwendolen
- Gwendolyn (disambiguation)
- Gwenn
- Guinevere
- Gwendal
- Gwendalyn
