= Wendy =

Given name generally given to girls

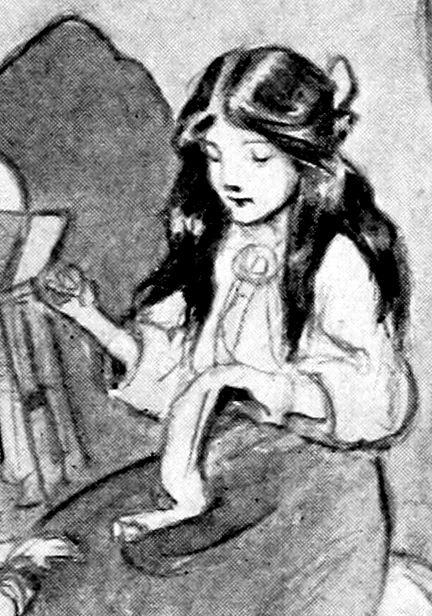
- Wendy Darling drawn by Oliver Herford in The Peter Pan Alphabet
- Pronunciation: (/ˈwɛndi/)
- Gender: Female
- Language: English

Other names
- Alternative spelling: Wendi, Wendie
- Related names: Gwendolyn, Gwen, Wendeline, Wendelinda, Winifred

Wendy is a Welsh feminine given name from Gwendolen and Gwendoline.

Wendy is a place name of a hamlet in Cambridgeshire, listed in the Domesday Book under the name of Wandrie. In Great Britain during the English Civil War in the mid-1600s, a male Captain Wendy Oxford was identified by the Leveller John Lilburne as a spy reporting on his activities. It was also used as a surname in Britain from at least the 17th century. Its popularity in Great Britain as a feminine name is owed to the character Wendy Darling from the 1904 play Peter Pan and its 1911 novelisation Peter and Wendy, both written by J. M. Barrie. Its popularity reached a peak in the 1960s, and subsequently declined. The name was inspired by young Margaret Henley (1888–1894), who died aged five from meningitis, daughter of Barrie's poet friend W. E. Henley. Reportedly, Margaret used to call Barrie my friendy. With the common early childhood difficulty pronouncing Rs, this came out as my fwendy and my fwendy-wendy.

== People ==
=== Business and politics ===
- Wendy Alexander, Scottish politician
- Wendy Bourne, Australian politician
- Wendy Dant Chesser, American politician
- Wendy Davis (politician) (born 1963), American politician
- Wendi Deng (born 1968), Chinese-born American businesswoman
- Wendy Hausman, American politician
- Wendy Larson, American politician
- Wendy Morgan, Guernsey politician
- Wendy Piper, American politician
- Wendy Thomas (born 1961), daughter of fast food chain Wendy's founder Dave Thomas and the company's namesake
- Wendy Thomas (politician) (born 1958 or 1959), New Hampshire state representative

=== Film, theatre, television, and radio ===
- Wendy Beckett (1930–2018), British religious sister and art historian
- Wendy Bergen (1956–2017), American television journalist
- Wendy Craig (born 1934), English actress
- Wendy Davis (born 1966), American actress
- Wendy Greengross (1925–2012), English general practitioner and broadcaster
- Wendy Hiller (1912–2003), English actress
- Wendy Hoopes (born 1972), Malaysian American voice actress
- Wendy Kaufman (born 1958), American television personality
- Wendy Makkena (born 1958), American actress
- Wendie Malick (born 1950), American actress and former fashion model
- Wendi McLendon-Covey (born 1969), American actress and comedian
- Wendy Mesley (born 1957), Canadian television journalist and reporter
- Wendy Morgan (born 1958), English actress
- Wendy Morgan, Canadian film director
- Wendy Pack, a character from Wack Pack on The Howard Stern Show
- Wendy Padbury (born 1947), English actress
- Wendi Peters (born 1968), English actress
- Wendy Phillips (born 1952), American actress
- Wendy Richard (1943–2009), English actress
- Wendy Robie (born 1953), American actress
- Wendy Raquel Robinson (born 1967), American actress
- Wendie Jo Sperber (1958–2005), American actress
- Wendy Schaal (born 1954), American actress
- Wendy Stites (born 1949), Australian production and costume designer
- Wendy Tilby (born 1960), Canadian animator and director
- Wendy Toye (1917–2010), English director and actress
- Wendy Williams (1934–2019), English actress
- Wendy Williams (born 1964), American television and radio presenter, businesswoman, author, actress and media personality
- Wendy O. Williams (1949–1998), American singer and former member of Plasmatics

=== Sports ===
- Wendy Brown (heptathlete) (born 1966), American heptathlete
- Wendy Cruz (born 1976), Dominican Republic cyclist
- Wendy Fuller (born 1965), Canadian diver
- Wendy Holdener (born 1993), Swiss alpine skier
- Wendy Lucero-Schayes (born 1963), American diver
- Wendie Renard (born 1990), French football player
- Wendy Richter (born 1960), American wrestler
- Wendy Vereen (born 1966), American former sprinter
- Wendy Weinberg (born 1958), American Olympic medalist swimmer
- Wendi Willits Wells (born 1978), American basketball coach
- Wendy Wyland (1964–2003), American diver
- Wendy Shongwe (born 2003), South African sprinter and soccer player

=== Arts ===
- Wendy Bagwell (1925–1996), founding member and leader of the Southern gospel music and comedy trio Wendy Bagwell and the Sunliters
- Wendy Brown (born 1955), American political theorist
- Wendy Carlos (born 1939), American composer
- Wendy Chung (born 1968), Hong Kong pop and C-Pop lyricist
- Wendy Cope (born 1945), English poet
- Wendy Davies (born 1942), British professor of history
- Wendy J. Fox (born 1979), American author
- Wendy M. Grossman (born 1954), journalist, blogger, and folksinger
- Wendy Heard, American author
- Wendy Holden (author, born 1961), British journalist and author
- Wendy Holden (author, born 1965), British chick-lit novelist
- Wendy James (born 1966), Transvision Vamp's singer
- Wendy Mass (born 1967), American author especially of young adult and children's novels
- Wendy Melvoin (born 1964), American musician and composer and twin sister of Susannah Melvoin
- Wendy Partridge (born 1954), British-Canadian costume designer
- Wendy Pepper (1964–2017), American fashion designer
- Wendy Pini (born 1951), American creator, artist and writer of the fantasy comic book universe Elfquest
- Wendy Shon (born 1994), Korean singer and member of Red Velvet
- Wendy Sulca (born 1996), Peruvian singer
- Wendy Wasserstein (1950–2006), American playwright
- Wendy Whelan (born 1967), American ballet dancer and associate artistic director of New York City Ballet
- Wendy Wilson (born 1969), American pop singer and daughter of The Beach Boys singer, Brian Wilson
- Wendy Rose (born 1948), American Hopi/Miwok writer

=== Science and engineering ===
- Wendy Campbell-Purdie (1925–1985), New Zealand tree-planter
- Wendy Chung, American geneticist
- Wendy Flavell (born 1961), British physics professor
- Wendy Gibson, British professor in protozoology
- Wendy Lou (born 1962), Canadian statistician
- Wendy L. Martinez, American statistician
- Wendy Lee Queen (born 1981), American chemist and material scientist

=== Other ===
- Wendy Albano (died 2012), American woman who was murdered in Bangkok
- Wendy Carlin (born 1957), Australian professor of economics
- Wendy Fitzwilliam (born 1972), Miss Universe 1998 from Trinidad and Tobago
- Wendy Law (1960–2026), British crossword compiler and librarian
- Wendy M. Masiello (born 1958), United States Air Force general
- Wendy Metcalfe, Canadian journalist, editor and news executive
- Wendi Michelle Scott (born 1975), American criminal convicted of abusing her daughter in a case of Münchausen syndrome by proxy
- Wendy Osefo (born 1984), Nigierian-American public affairs academic, political commentator and The Real Housewives of Potomac cast member
- Wendy Wolin (1958–1966), American murder victim

== Animals ==
- Wendy (coyote), a coyote that resided in Los Angeles, California

== Fictional characters ==
- Wendy Blob in Hotel Transylvania: The Series
- Wendy Christensen in Final Destination 3
- Wendy Corduroy in Gravity Falls
- Wendy Harris in the Super Friends cartoon and comic book
- Wendy Marvell in Fairy Tail
- Wendy Peyser in American Horror Story: Asylum
- Wendy Byrde in Ozark
- Wendy Testaburger in South Park
- Winnifred "Wendy" Torrance, one of the main characters in Stephen King's The Shining
- Wendy Wu, the titular character of Wendy Wu: Homecoming Warrior
- Wendy the Good Little Witch in Harvey Comics
- Wendy, a character in Bob the Builder
- Wendy Wolf, a character in Peppa Pig
- Wendy in How I Met Your Mother
- Wendy Darling in Peter Pan
- Wendy Harris in Mom (TV series)
- Agent Wendy Pleakley in Disney's Lilo & Stitch franchise
