= Gwenda (given name) =

Gwenda is a feminine given name of Welsh origin. It was apparently derived in the 19th century using the Welsh adjectives gwen "white, fair, blessed" and da "good", and may be a variant of Gwendolen (otherwise Gwendaline), or a feminine form of Gwyndaf, a Welsh saint.

'Gwenda' first appears in the UK General Register Office registration of births in the September 1874 Quarter, and for marriages in the June 1861 Quarter. It was "regularly used until the 1960s, now rare."

== Notable people named Gwenda ==
- Gwenda Blair (born 1943), American nonfiction author
- Gwenda Bond (born 1976), American writer
- Gwenda Deacon (1946–2006), American actress
- Gwenda Evans, British costume designer
- Gwenda Ewen, British actress
- Gwenda Hawkes (1894–1990), British racing driver
- Gwenda Lorenzetti, Canadian actress
- Gwenda Morgan (1908–1991), British artist
- Gwenda Owen (born 1965), Welsh singer
- Gwenda Thomas (born 1942), Welsh politician
- Gwenda Wilson (1921–1977), British television and radio actress
- Gwenda Young, Irish film scholar and author

== Fictional characters ==
- Gwenda Halliday in the Agatha Christie novel Sleeping Murder (1976)
- Gwenda Vaughan in the Agatha Christie novel Ordeal by Innocence (1958)

== See also ==
- Glenda (given name) ("came rather later [than Gwenda] and may have been suggested by this name")
- Gwen (given name)
- Wendy
- Cyclone Gwenda
