= Winnie =

Winnie or Winny may refer to:

== Animals ==
- Winnipeg (bear), a Canadian black bear at the London Zoo in the 1920s
- Winnie (feline), a supposed big cat sighted in the Netherlands in 2005

== Arts and entertainment ==
=== Fictional characters ===
- Winnie (name), includes fictional characters with the given name, including
  - Winnie-the-Pooh, a fictional teddy bear created by A. A. Milne

=== Film ===
- Winnie Mandela (film), a 2011 Canadian film about Winnie Mandela, originally titled Winnie
- Winnie (2017 film), a South African biographical documentary film about Winnie Mandela
- Winny, a Japanese film featuring Masahiro Higashide

== People ==
- Winnie (name), various persons and fictional characters with the given name
- David Winnie (born 1966), Scottish former association football player and manager

== Places ==
- Winnie, Texas, a census-designated place in the U.S.
- Winnie, Virginia, an unincorporated community in the U.S.

== Other uses ==
- Coty Award for womenswear, popularly nicknamed Winnie
- List of storms named Winnie
- Winnie, one of a pair of British cross-Channel guns in the Second World War near Dover, the other being named Pooh
- Winnie (hard disk), a colloquial term for hard disk used in the past
- Winnie (website), an application that helps parents go places with their children
- Winny, a Japanese peer-to-peer program

== See also ==
- Win (disambiguation)
- Wini (disambiguation)
- Winnie-the-Pooh (disambiguation)
- Winifred (disambiguation)
- Winston (disambiguation)
