= Gwendolen =

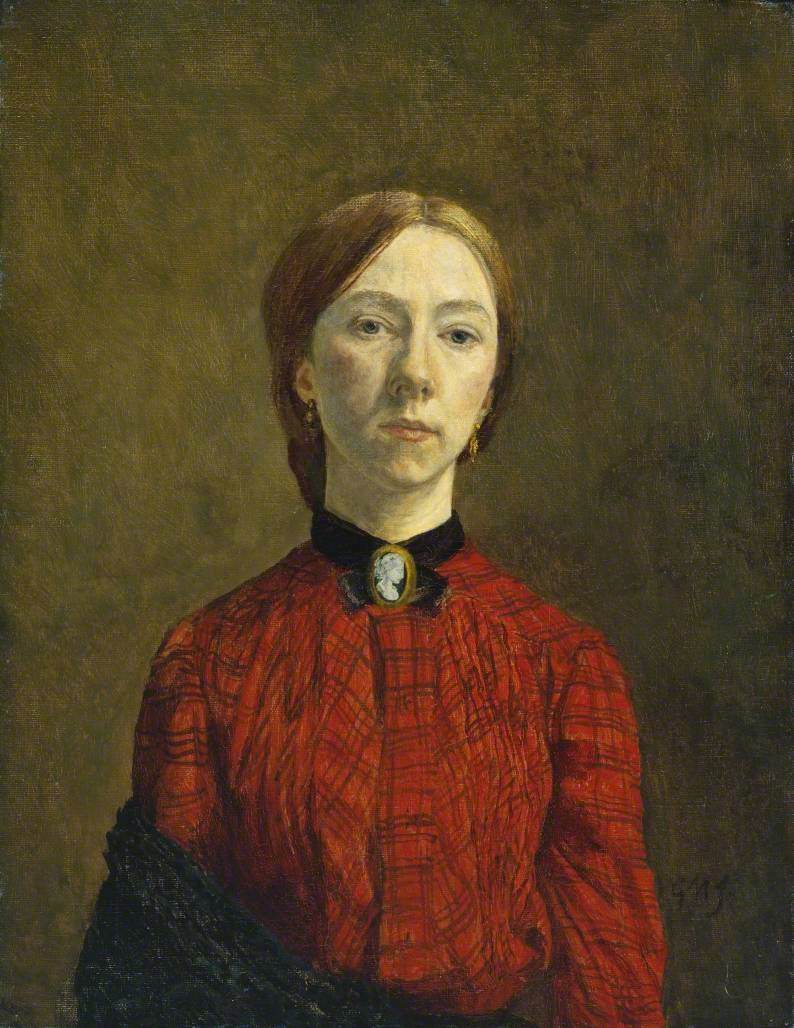
- Gwendolen Mary John, Self-portrait, 1902
- Pronunciation: /ˈɡwɛndəlɪn/ GWEN-də-lin
- Gender: Female
- Language: English, Welsh

Origin
- Origin: possibly from Welsh gwen = "white, holy/blessed" + dolen = "loop, link, ring"
- Meaning: "blessed ring"

Other names
- Alternative spelling: Guendolen, Gwendoline, Gwendolyn, Gwendolin
- Nicknames: Gwen, Wendy, Winnie

Gwendolen (from Welsh gwen 'white, fair, blessed' and dolen 'loop, link of a chain, ring, bow') is a feminine given name, in general use only since the 19th century.

It has come to be the standard English form of Latin Guendoloena, which was first used by Geoffrey of Monmouth as the name of a legendary British queen in his History of the Kings of Britain (c. 1138). He reused the name in his Life of Merlin (c. 1150) for a different character, the wife of the titular magician "Merlinus", a counsellor to King Arthur; (Note: "Robert (de Boron) and his continuators also expand upon hints—in the Welsh poem Yr Afallennau (The Apple Tree) and the Life of Merlin—that Merlin has had a lover or wife. […] The pedigree of Merlin’s mistress as the daughter of a landholder favoured by the divine huntress Diana (who is not as chaste in medieval legend as in classical myth) or as an adherent of the Lady of the Lake crowns Merlin’s folkloric roots as Wild Man and forest dweller." (See also John Jay Parry's 1925 translation of The Life of Merlin at sacred-texts.com)) the metre shows that Geoffrey pronounced it as a pentasyllable, Guĕndŏlŏēnă, with the "gu" pronounced /ɡw/. Dr. Arthur Hutson suggests that "Guendoloena" arose from a misreading of the old Welsh masculine name Guendoleu; Geoffrey may have mistaken the final U for an N, then Latinized *Guendolen as a feminine name to arrive at Guendoloena. In the Vita Merlini, however, Geoffrey Latinizes the masculine name of Gwenddoleu ap Ceidio as Guennolous. Spelled Gwendoloena, the name reoccurs in the anonymous Latin romance De Ortu Waluuanii belonging to Arthur's queen Guinevere.

It did not become a common English given name until the 19th century. Gwendoline was in use in England by the 1860s (an early example being Lady Gwendoline Anson, born c. 1837, a daughter of the 1st Earl of Lichfield), and Gwendolen appeared in Daniel Deronda, written by George Eliot and published in serialized form 1874–6.

== Notable bearers ==
=== People ===
- Gwendolen Margaret Carter (1906–1991), Canadian scholar of African affairs
- Gwendolen Mary "Gwen" John (1876–1939), Welsh painter
- Gwendolen Fer (born 1986), French Equestrian rider
- Gwendolen Fitzalan-Howard, Duchess of Norfolk (1877–1945), British duchess
- Gwendolen Guinness, Countess of Iveagh (1881–1966), Conservative politician in the United Kingdom
- Gwendolen "Len" Howard (1894–1973), British naturalist and musician
- Gwendolen Overton, American writer
- Joyce Gwendolen Quin (born 1944), Labour Party politician in the United Kingdom
- Gwendolen Mary "Gwen" Raverat (1885–1957), English wood engraver
- F. Gwendolen Rees (1906–1994), British zoologist and parasitologist
- Ella Gwendolen Rees Williams (1890–1979), novelist from Dominica
- Guendalina Sastri (born 1953), Italian actress and singer
- Gwendoline Christie (born 1978), English actress and model

=== Fictional characters ===
- Gwendolen, mythical queen of the Britons
- Guendoloena (Gwendolen), Merlin's wife in the Life of Merlin (not to be confused with Ganieda (Gwenddydd), Merlin's sister in the same work)
- Guendolen, the fairy mistress of King Arthur and mother of Gyneth in Sir Walter Scott's work The Bridal of Triermain (1813)
- Gwendolen, loathly lady in Reginald Heber's Fragments of The Masque of Gwendolen (written 1816, published 1830)
- Gwendolen Harleth, heroine in Daniel Deronda (1876), the last novel George Eliot completed
- Gwendolen Fairfax, a major character in Oscar Wilde's comedy The Importance of Being Earnest (1895)
- Gwendolen, a tragic, snobbish novelist in Henry James's 1896 short story The Figure in the Carpet
- Gwendolen Vincent Lesley, Marigold's second cousin in L. M. Montgomery's novel Magic for Marigold
- Gwendolen, the mistress of Thomas Becket and Prince Henry II in Jean Anouilh's play Becket (1959)
- Gwendolen Chant, antagonist in Diana Wynne Jones' fantasy novel Charmed Life (1977)
- Gwendolyn Tennyson, supporting protagonist in the Cartoon Network animated show, Ben 10
- Gwendolen, a dragon in The Last Dragon Chronicles
- Gwendolin, a hero character from Bloons TD 6
- Gwendolyne "Gwen" Stacy, Marvel Comics character, the first romantic interest of Spider-Man

=== Other ===
- SS Gwendolen, a British steamship launched in 1899 and named for Lady Gwendolen Cecil, daughter of Lord Salisbury
- 10870 Gwendolen, a main-belt asteroid named for the discoverer's mother, educator Mary Gwendolen Ellery Read Aikman (1903–1994)
- Gwendolen, a 1989 novel by Buchi Emecheta

== See also ==
- Gwen (given name)
- Gwendoline (disambiguation)
- Gwendolyn
- Guendalina (disambiguation)
