= Winnie (name) =

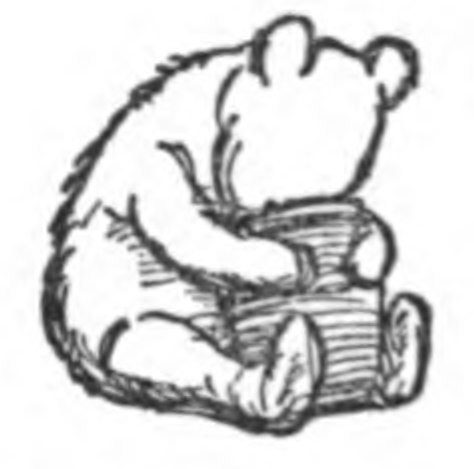
- Illustration by Ernest Howard Shepard from Winnie-the-Pooh (1926), by A A Milne. The name Winnie has associations with the character from the children’s book.
- Pronunciation: (/ˈwɪniː/)
- Gender: Unisex

Origin
- Origin: Welsh (Wales)
- Meaning: fair one white and smooth soft happiness fair and pure

Other names
- Related names: Winne

Winnie or Winny (/ˈwɪniː/ WIN-ee) is both a male and a female given name of Welsh origin, a short form (hypocorism) of Edwina, Winona, Winifred or Winnifred, Winter, Gwendolyn, Guinevere (Welsh), Gwyneth (Welsh), and Wynne (Welsh). The name's meaning is: fair one, white and smooth, soft, happiness, or fair and pure. The popularity of the name Winnie steadily declined among American women in the 20th century, but in the 1990 US Census, still ranked 699th of 4276.

It is also a male name from Cambodia (meaning bright), and a short form of the male English given name Winston. It can also derive from many other names ending in -win such as Edwin, Darwin, etc., or be a nickname for the Welsh name Wyn.

== People ==
- Varina Anne Davis (1864–1898), called Winnie, author and daughter of Confederate President Jefferson Davis
- Winnie Baze (1914–2006), American football player
- Winnie Branson (1927–1972), Aboriginal Australian activist
- Winnie Cordero (born 1966), Filipina comedian, actress, and TV host
- Winnie Ewing (1929–2023), Scottish nationalist and politician
- Winnie Haatrecht (born 1963), Dutch-Surinamese retired footballer and currently a player's agent
- Winnie Harlow (born 1994), Canadian model and spokesperson on the skin condition vitiligo
- Winnie Holzman (born 1954), American dramatist, screenwriter and poet
- Winne Hung (born 1999), Hong Kong rower
- Winny de Jong (born 1958), Dutch politician
- Winnie Ruth Judd (1905–1998), American convicted double murderer
- Winnie Kiap, diplomat from Papua New Guinea
- Luamanuvao Winnie Laban (born 1955), New Zealand politician
- Winnie Lau (born 1971), Hong Kong singer and actress
- Winnie Leuszler (1926–2004), Canadian swimmer
- Winnie Lightner (1899–1971), American film actress
- Winnie Madikizela-Mandela (1936–2018), South African anti-apartheid activist, politician, and ex-wife of former South African president Nelson Mandela
- Winnie Nanyondo (born 1993), Ugandan middle- and long-distance runner
- Winnie Ng (born 1952), Hong Kong long-distance runner
- Winnie Shaw (1947–1992), Scottish tennis player
- Winnie Wong-Ng, Chinese-American physical chemist
- Winnie Yu (born 1954), Cantonese radio director

== Fictional characters ==
- Winnie-the-Pooh or Winnie the Pooh, an anthropomorphic fictional bear created by A. A. Milne
- Winnie, a kid werewolf in the movies Hotel Transylvania and Hotel Transylvania 2
- Winnie, the protagonist of Samuel Beckett's play Happy Days
- Winnie, a character in the Hotel Transylvania movie series
- Winnie the Wasp, a wasp who appears in Season 2 of Jim Henson's Animal Show
- Winnie the Witch, title character of the Winnie the Witch children's picture book series by Valerie Thomas
- Gwendolyn "Winnie" Cooper, a main character from the American television series The Wonder Years
- Winifred "Winnie" Foster, a main character from the American book and movie Tuck Everlasting
- Winnie Lopez, police officer from St. Cloud in FX Fargo
- Winnie Mann, Helena Peabody's former partner in Showtime's The L Word
- Winnie Oh, a teacher in Degrassi
- Winnie Sanderson, Bette Midler's character in the 1993 film Hocus Pocus
- Winnie Tibideaux, Sondra and Elvin's daughter on the American television series The Cosby Show
- Winnie Winkle, the title character of Winnie Winkle, an American comic strip published from 1920 to 1996
- Winnie Woodpecker, the girlfriend of animated cartoon character Woody Woodpecker

== See also ==
- David Winnie (born 1966), Scottish former association football player and manager
- Winnie (disambiguation)
- Wenno (Winne), the first Master of the Sword-Brothers
