= Winifreda (disambiguation) =

Winifreda is a town in Argentina.

Winifreda may also refer to:

- Winifreda (horse) (1897–1912), a British Thoroughbred racehorse
- Winifreda (ship), later SS Mesaba, a UK transatlantic cargo liner launched in 1897

== See also ==
- Winifred (disambiguation)
