= Gwyneth =

- Pronunciation: Welsh: [ˈɡwɨ̞nɛθ]
- Gender: Feminine

Origin
- Meaning: uncertain; first element may be Welsh gwyn "white", but see Etymology of Gwynedd

Other names
- Related names: Gwen; Gwendolyn; Gwenith; Gwinnett; Gwenyth; Gwynedd; Venetia; Gweneth

Gwyneth (sometimes Gweneth, Gwynyth or Gwenyth) is a Welsh feminine given name which derives from the kingdom of Gwynedd. It gained popularity, first in Wales and then across the English speaking world, in the 19th century. This may have been the result of author Ann Harriet Hughes, who adopted Gwyneth Vaughan as her pen name.

Notable people:

- Gwyneth Boodoo, American psychologist and expert on educational measurement
- Gwyneth Cravens, American novelist and journalist
- Gwyneth Dunwoody (1930–2008), Member of Parliament in the United Kingdom
- Gwyneth Glyn (born 1979), Welsh language poet and musician
- Gwyneth Herbert (born 1981), British singer-songwriter and composer
- Gwyneth Ho (born 1990), Hong Kong social activist and former journalist
- Gwyneth Hughes, British screenwriter and documentary director
- Mabel Gweneth Humphreys, mathematician
- Gwyneth Johnstone (1915–2010), English landscape painter
- Gwyneth Jones (novelist) (born 1952), British science fiction and fantasy writer and critic
- Gwyneth Jones (soprano) DBE (born 1936), Welsh soprano
- Gwyneth Lewis (born 1959), Welsh poet, first National Poet for Wales
- Gweneth Lilly (1920–2004), Welsh writer and teacher
- Gweneth Molony (born 1932), Australian figure skater
- Gwyneth Paltrow (born 1972), American actress and businesswoman
- Gwyneth Philips (born 2000), American ice hockey player
- Gwyneth Powell (1946–2022), English actress
- Gwyneth Rees (born 1968), British author of children's books
- Gwyneth Scally, visual contemporary artist from Tucson, Arizona, United States
- Gwyneth Stallard, British mathematician
- Gwyneth Strong (born 1959), English actress
- Gwyneth Walker (born 1947), American composer
- Gwenethe Walshe (1908–2006), British dancer
- Gwynyth Walsh (born 1956), Canadian actress
- Gweneth Whitteridge, medical historian

Gwyneth is also the name of the following fictional characters:

- a character in the Fur Fighters video game
- the title character of Gwyneth and the Thief, a young adult historical romance novel written by Margaret Moore
- Gwyneth, a character in the Dragonlance novel The Legend of Huma
- Gwyneth Sanders, a fictional character from Looped
- Gwynneth, an Australian Masked Owl from the Wolves of the Beyond fantasy novel series by Kathryn Lasky
- Gwyneth "Gwyn" Berdara, a character from the A Court of Thorns and Roses fantasy series by Sarah J. Maas
- Gwyneth, a character in the Doctor Who episode The Unquiet Dead

== See also ==
- Gwynedd (disambiguation)
