= Gwenn =

Gwenn is a surname and unisex (though more often feminine) given name of Breton origin, a variant of the name Gwen, which means 'white, holy'. Notable people with the name include:

- Edmund Gwenn (1877–1959), English actor
- Gwenn Flowers, American glaciologist
- Gwenn Foulon (born 1998), French footballer
- Gwenn Seemel (born 1981), American painter
- Gwenn Story (1960–1979), American murder victim

== See also ==
- Gwenn-Aël Bolloré (1925–2001), French soldier, businessman, author, and publisher
