= Gwendolyn =

- Pronunciation: /ˈɡwɛndəlɪn/ GWEN-dəl-in
- Gender: Female
- Language: Welsh

Origin
- Meaning: possibly "white ring"

Other names
- Alternative spelling: Gwendolyne, Guendolen, Gwendolen, Gwendoline, Gwendolin⁣, Gwyndilyn, Gwendalyn
- Nicknames: Gwen, Wendy, Winnie

Gwendolyn is a feminine given name, a variant spelling of Gwendolen (perhaps influenced by names such as Carolyn, Evelyn and Marilyn). This has been the most popular spelling in the United States.

== Notable people called Gwendolyn/Gwendoline ==
- Gwendolyn B. Bennett (1902–1981), American writer
- Gwendolyn Black (1911–2005), Canadian musician, educator and activist
- Gwendolyn Bradley, American soprano
- Gwendolyn T. Britt (1941–2008), American Democratic politician
- Gwendolyn Brooks (1917–2000), American poet
- Gwendoline Christie, British actress
- Gwendolyn J. Elliott (1945–2007), American police officer and founder of Gwen's Girls
- Gwendolyn Faison, American Democratic politician
- Gwendolyn A. Foster, American military officer, nurse practitioner, midwife
- Gwendolyn Audrey Foster, American professor of English and film studies
- Gwendolyn Garcia (born 1955), Filipino politician
- Gwendolyn Graham (born 1963), American serial killer
- Gwendolyn Holbrow (born 1957), American artist
- Gwendolyn L. "Gwen" Ifill (1955–2016), American journalist
- Gwendolyn King, American businesswoman
- Gwendolyn Knight (1914–2005), American sculptor
- Gwendolyn Lau, American voice actress
- Gwendolyn Lycett, British figure skater
- Gwendolyn MacEwen (1941–1987), Canadian novelist and poet
- Gwendolyn "Gwen" Marston (1936–2019), American textile artist and writer
- Gwendolyn Masin (born 1977), Dutch-born violinist
- Gwendolyn O’Neal (born 1946), American academic administrator and home economist
- Gwendolyn Osborne (born 1978), British model and actress
- Gwendolyn Rees (1892–1939), American tennis player
- Gwendolyn Rutten, Belgian politician
- Gwendolyn Sanford, American singer-songwriter
- Gwendolyn Zepeda (born 1971), American author

== Fictional characters ==
- Gwen Cooper, a fictional character in the BBC science-fiction television programme Torchwood
- Gwendolyn "Winnie" Cooper, a central character in the American television series The Wonder Years (1988–1993)
- Haley Gwendolyn Dunphy, a main character in Modern Family
- Dark Sun Gwyndolin, a secret boss in the 2011 video game Dark Souls
- Gwendolyn Jones, German name of Bronwyn Jones, a supporting character in the animated series Fireman Sam
- Gwendoline Lacey, a character in Enid Bylton's Malory Towers
- Gwendolyn Lancaster, main character in Jim Butcher’s The Aeronaut's Windlass first book of the Cinder Spires series
- Gwendolyn Pierce, a character in the American sitcom television series Charles in Charge
- Gwendolyn "Gwen" Poole, the title character of the comic book series Unbelievable Gwenpool.
- Gwendolyn Shepherd, main character in Kerstin Gier's Ruby Red and sequels novels.
- Gwendolyne Maxine "Gwen" Stacy, a supporting character in the Spider-Man comic book series
- Gwendolyn "Gwen" Tennyson, the cousin of Ben Tennyson on the Cartoon Network's media franchise Ben 10.
- Gwendolyn "Gwen" Winthrop, a witch in the American soap opera Passions (1999–2008)
- Gwendolyn, one of the family's pursuers in Saga comic book series
- Gwendolyn, a were-wyrm in the DLC "Desolation of Mordor" of Middle-earth: Shadow of War (2017)
- Gwendolyn, a valkyrie, one of the protagonists in the video game Odin Sphere (2007)
- Gwendolyn, a Roman centurion, a minor character in Rick Riordan's 2011 fantasy novel The Son of Neptune.
- "Gwen" (Guinevere), a main character in the television series Merlin.
- Gwendolyn Clawthorne, a minor character in The Owl House.

== See also ==
- Gwen (given name)
- Gwendolen
- Gwendoline
- Guendalina (disambiguation)
- Gwendal
- Gwendalyn
