= Wendeline =

Wendeline may refer to:

- 1438 Wendeline, a main-belt asteroid
- 15268 Wendelinefroger, a main-belt asteroid, named after Wendeline Froger (born 1948)
- Nina Bang (born Nina Henriette Wendeline Ellinger; 1866–1928), a Danish social democratic politician

== See also ==
- Gwendoline (disambiguation)
- Gwendoline
