= Daniel Deronda (film) =

1921 British film by Walter Courtney Rowden

- Directed by: Walter Courtney Rowden
- Written by: George Eliot (novel); Frank Miller
- Starring: Reginald Fox; Ann Trevor; Clive Brook
- Production company: Master Films
- Distributed by: Butcher's Film Service
- Release date: 1921
- Country: United Kingdom
- Language: English

Daniel Deronda is a 1921 British silent drama film directed by Walter Courtney Rowden and starring Reginald Fox, Ann Trevor and Clive Brook. It is an adaptation of the 1876 novel Daniel Deronda by George Eliot. The short film was made at Teddington Studios by Master Films.

== Cast ==
- Reginald Fox - Daniel Deronda
- Ann Trevor - Mirah Lapidoth
- Clive Brook - Mallinger Grandcourt
- Yolande Duquette - Mrs Glasher
- Dorothy Fane - Gwendolen Harleth
