= Guendalina =

Guendalina (the Italian form of the female given name Gwendolen/Gwendoline/Gwendolyn) may refer to:

== People ==
- Guendalina Buffon (born 1973), Italian volleyball player
- Guendalina Sartori (born 1988), Italian archer

== Arts and entertainment ==
- Guendalina (film), 1957 film by Alberto Lattuada
