= Build Thy House =

1920 British film by Fred Goodwins

- Directed by: Fred Goodwins
- Written by: S. Trevor Jones (story); Eliot Stannard (screenplay)
- Starring: Henry Ainley; Ann Trevor; Warwick Ward; Claude Rains
- Production company: Ideal Film Company
- Distributed by: Ideal Film Company
- Release date: 1920
- Country: United Kingdom
- Language: English

Build Thy House is a 1920 British silent film directed by Fred Goodwins, and starring Henry Ainley, Ann Trevor, Reginald Bach and Claude Rains in his film debut. The screenplay was written by Eliot Stannard from the story by S. Trevor Jones.

The film was the winner of a £200 scenario writing contest.

== Cast ==
- Henry Ainley - Arthur Burnaby
- Ann Trevor - Helen Dawson
- Reginald Bach - Jim Medway
- Warwick Ward - Burnaby
- Jerrold Robertshaw - John Dawson
- Adelaide Grace - Mrs. Medway
- Howard Cochran - Marshall
- Claude Rains - Clarkis
- R. Van Cortlandt - Mr. Cramer
- Mrs. Ainley - Miss Brown
- V. Vivian-Vivian - Florence Burnaby
