= A Rogue in Love =

1922 film

- Directed by: Albert Brouett
- Written by: Tom Gallon (novel); Harry Hughes
- Starring: Frank Stanmore; Ann Trevor; Gregory Scott
- Production company: Diamond Super
- Distributed by: Globe
- Release date: September 1922
- Country: United Kingdom
- Languages: Silent; English intertitles

A Rogue in Love is a 1922 British silent film directed by Albert Brouett and starring Frank Stanmore, Ann Trevor and Gregory Scott.

== Cast ==
- Frank Stanmore as Frank Badgery
- Ann Trevor as Pattie Keable
- Gregory Scott as Joe Bradwick
- Fred Rains as Joseph Keable
- Lawford Davidson as Ray Carrell
- Betty Farquhar as Eudocia
- Kate Gurney as Landlady

== Bibliography ==
- Goble, Alan. The Complete Index to Literary Sources in Film. Walter de Gruyter, 1999.
