= Daniel Deronda (TV series) =

- Genre: Drama
- Based on: Daniel Deronda by George Eliot
- Screenplay by: Andrew Davies
- Directed by: Tom Hooper
- Starring: Hugh Dancy; Romola Garai; Hugh Bonneville; Jodhi May
- Theme music composer: Rob Lane
- Country of origin: United Kingdom
- Original language: English
- No. of series: 1
- No. of episodes: 4

Production
- Executive producers: Kate Harwood; Laura Mackie; Rebecca Eaton
- Producer: Louis Marks
- Editor: Philip Kloss
- Running time: 210 minutes
- Production company: WGBH Boston for BBC

Original release
- Network: BBC1
- Release: 23 November – 7 December 2002

Daniel Deronda is a British four-part television serial drama adapted by Andrew Davies from the 1876 George Eliot novel of the same name. It was directed by Tom Hooper, produced by Louis Marks, and was first broadcast in three parts on BBC One from 23 November to 7 December 2002. The serial starred Hugh Dancy as Daniel Deronda, Romola Garai as Gwendolen Harleth, Hugh Bonneville as Henleigh Grandcourt, and Jodhi May as Mirah Lapidoth. Co-production funding came from WGBH Boston.

== Plot ==
Set in 1870s England, the story involves the overlapping narratives of two characters. Daniel Deronda is an intelligent and handsome young man of obscure origins who has been raised as part of the family of his guardian, Sir Hugo Mallinger. Gwendolen Harleth is a spoiled, beautiful young woman living with her mother and sisters in an obscure country neighbourhood. She is confident that she will marry a rich man. The likelihood of this increases when she is introduced to a neighbour, Henleigh Grandcourt, who is heir to Sir Hugo Mallinger. He becomes infatuated with Gwendolen and shows a clear intention to propose; although Gwendolen is not in love with him, she intends to accept. However, on the day of the proposal, Gwendolen meets a woman who claims to be Grandcourt's mistress and presents three children whom she claims are his offspring. She tells Gwendolen that she left her husband for Grandcourt and begs Gwendolen not to marry him because it will ruin her children's prospects as his heirs. Horrified by this revelation, Gwendolen promises not to marry Grandcourt and accepts an invitation to travel to Germany with some friends to avoid him.

In Germany, Gwendolen captures the attention of Daniel, making extravagant wagers in a casino. When she returns to her room, she finds a telegram from her mother, informing her that the family is now bankrupt, thanks to bad investments. With no money for the journey home, she pawns a valuable necklace but it is returned to her before she leaves. She realises the person who has done so is Deronda. Once back in England, Gwendolen is desperate to improve her family's circumstances. When Grandcourt arrives, proposing marriage and offering to support her family, she reluctantly accepts. In London, Deronda rescues a young woman trying to drown herself. He takes her to the home of some friends to recover and learns that she is a Jewish singer named Mirah Lapidoth who had run away from her father and in despair, tried to commit suicide. As she recovers, Deronda becomes more interested in her and Judaism.

After Gwendolen's marriage, Grandcourt is a controlling and abusive husband intent on crushing Gwendolen's spirit. He openly flaunts the second family he is maintaining. Gwendolen meets Deronda again and the two become friends. Deronda becomes Gwendolen's confidant. Simultaneously he tries to improve Mirah's circumstances, using his position to promote her as a singer, despite the antisemitic prejudice prevalent in society. Through him, she is reunited with her long-lost brother, Mordecai. Unexpectedly Deronda receives a letter from his mother, the Contessa Maria Alcharisi, requesting him to meet her in Genoa. Grandcourt, aware of the connection between his wife and Deronda, forces Gwendolen to take a Mediterranean cruise with him. Knowing Deronda will be there as well, Gwendolen has them stop in Genoa. Deronda meets his mother, discovering she is a famous Jewish singer. She gave Daniel to one of her admirers, Sir Hugo, to act as guardian so that Daniel could be raised as an English gentleman and not as a Jew. She confesses that she is dying and wished to see him one last time. Deronda is elated to discover he is Jewish and tells his mother that it is not something he could ever be ashamed of.

Returning from this encounter Daniel sees Gwendolen, who has been rescued after being pulled from the sea. Grandcourt drowned when he was knocked off their sailing boat and Gwendolen was rescued after jumping in after him with a rope. Alone with Deronda in her hotel room, Gwendolen confesses that when Grandcourt went into the water she hesitated to throw the rope, prepared to let him drown. Eventually she jumped in but it was too late. Deronda comforts her and tells her that it does not make her a bad person, and she declares that she wants to be with him.

Deronda cannot deny his love for Mirah and Sir Hugo reluctantly gives his blessing. Deronda meets Gwendolen, who has returned to live with her family, to tell her the news. Although disappointed, she gives him her best wishes and declares that because of knowing him, she will be a better person in life. Daniel and Mirah marry and sail away to the Near East.

== Cast ==
- Hugh Dancy as Daniel Deronda
- Romola Garai as Gwendolen Harleth
- Hugh Bonneville as Henleigh Grandcourt
- Jodhi May as Mirah Lapidoth
- Edward Fox as Sir Hugo Mallinger
- David Bamber as Lush
- Amanda Root as Mrs Davilow
- Anna Popplewell as Fanny Davilow
- Greta Scacchi as Lydia Glasher
- Barbara Hershey as Contessa Maria Alcharisi
- Nicholas Day as Lord Brackenshaw
- Georgie Glen as Lady Mallinger
- Simon Schatzberger as Ezra Cohen

== Production ==
Louis Marks originally wanted to make a film adaptation of the novel but abandoned the project after a lengthy and fruitless casting process. The drama took a further five years to make it to television screens. The serial was Marks' final television production before his death in 2010.

== Reception ==
John Leonard of New York Magazine wrote: "the same production team that did such a wonderful job on Middlemarch is equally adept here, although the heavy-breathing plot threatens every twenty minutes or so to make us smile in spite of our high-mindedness."

== Awards ==
British Academy Television Craft Awards

- Best Sound—Fiction/Entertainment – Won
- Best Editing—Fiction/Entertainment – Won
- Best Photography & Lighting—Fiction/Entertainment – Nominated
- Best Make Up & Hair Design – Nominated
- Best Costume Design – Nominated

Broadcasting Press Guild Awards

- Best Drama Series/Serial – Won

Banff Rockie Award

- Best Miniseries – Won

Royal Television Society Craft & Design Awards

- Costume Design - Drama - Nominated (Mike O'Neill)
- Music - Original Score - Won (Rob Lane)
- Production Design - Drama - Won (Don Taylor)
