= Gwynedd (disambiguation) =

Gwynedd is a principal area of Wales.

Gwynedd may also refer to:

- Kingdom of Gwynedd, the ancient Kingdom and nucleus of Upper Gwynedd
- Perfeddwlad, also known as Lower Gwynedd, or "middle country", as in between Gwynedd and England, and Gwynedd and Powys
- Gwynedd in the High Middle Ages
- Culture of Gwynedd during the High Middle Ages
- Upper Gwynedd Township, Montgomery County, Pennsylvania, U.S.
- Lower Gwynedd Township, Montgomery County, Pennsylvania
  - Gwynedd, Pennsylvania
  - Gwynedd Valley, Pennsylvania
  - Gwynedd-Mercy College
- Gwynedd (fictional), fictional Kingdom of Gwynedd in the Deryni series of novels

== See also ==
- Gwyneth
