= Wini =

Wini or WINI can refer to:

- Wini, Indonesia, a village in Indonesia with a border crossing to East Timor
- Wine (bishop), a medieval Bishop of London
- WINI, an American radio station
- Wini Wini, a mountain in Peru

== See also ==
- Winnie (disambiguation)
