= Daniel Deronda =

1876 novel by George Eliot

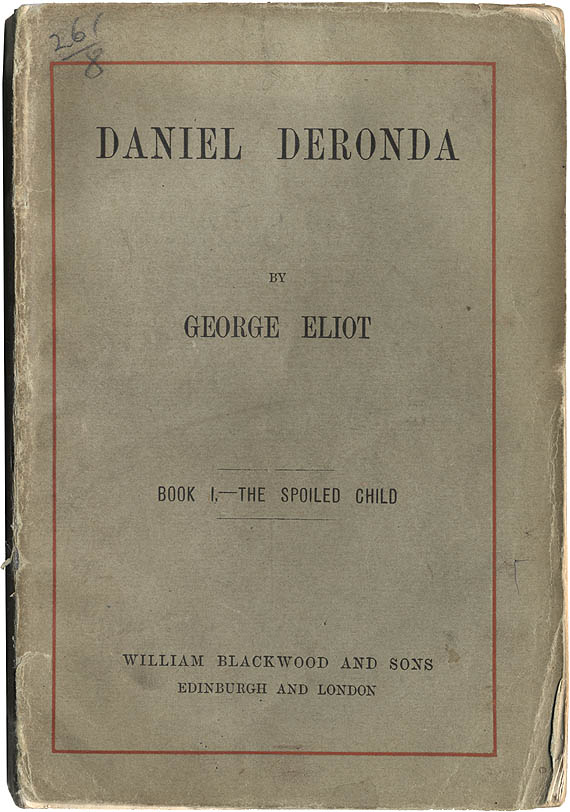
- Title page of the first edition, 1876
- Author: George Eliot
- Language: English
- Genre: Novel
- Publisher: William Blackwood and Sons, London (First English)
- Publication date: 1876
- Publication place: United Kingdom
- Media type: Print (hardback & paperback)
- ISBN: 978-1515089001
- Preceded by: Middlemarch
- Text: Daniel Deronda at Wikisource

Daniel Deronda is a novel by English author George Eliot (the pen name of Mary Ann Evans), first published in eight instalments from February to September 1876. It was the last novel she completed and the only one set in the Victorian society of her day. The work's mixture of social satire and moral searching, along with its sympathetic rendering of proto-Zionist ideas, has made it a final statement from one of the most renowned Victorian novelists.

The novel has been adapted for film three times, once as a silent feature and twice for television. It has also been adapted for the stage, notably in the 1960s by the 69 Theatre Company in Manchester with Vanessa Redgrave cast as the heroine Gwendolen Harleth.

The novel's plot has two strands. One is the "story of Gwendolen", which has been called "one of the masterpieces of English fiction", while the other, which is concerned with Daniel Deronda, has been described as "flat and unconvincing".

== Plot ==
Daniel Deronda contains two parallel narratives that are united by the title character. The novel begins in September 1865 with the meeting of Daniel and Gwendolen Harleth in the fictional town of Leubronn, Germany. Daniel finds himself attracted to, but wary of, the beautiful, stubborn, and selfish Gwendolen, whom he sees losing all her winnings in a game of roulette. The next day, Gwendolen receives a letter from her mother telling her that the family is financially ruined and asking her to come home. Gwendolen pawns a necklace and debates gambling again to make her fortune. However, her necklace is returned to her by a porter, and she realises that Daniel had seen her pawn the necklace and had redeemed it for her. From this point, the plot breaks off into two separate flashbacks; one gives us Gwendolen's history and the other Daniel's.

In October 1864, soon after the death of Gwendolen's stepfather, Gwendolen and her family move to a new neighborhood. There she meets Henleigh Mallinger Grandcourt, a taciturn and calculating man who proposes marriage shortly after their first meeting. At first she is open to his advances, but upon discovering that Grandcourt has several children with his mistress, Lydia Glasher, she eventually flees to the German town where she meets Daniel. This portion of the novel sets Gwendolen up as a haughty and selfish, yet affectionate, daughter admired for her beauty but suspected by many in society because of her satirical observations and somewhat manipulative behaviour. She is also prone to fits of terror that shake her otherwise calm and controlling exterior.

Daniel has been raised by a wealthy gentleman, Sir Hugo Mallinger. Daniel's relationship to Sir Hugo is ambiguous, and it is widely believed, even by Daniel, that he is Sir Hugo's illegitimate son, though no one is certain. Daniel is an intelligent and compassionate young man who cannot quite decide what to do with his life, and this is a sore point between him and Sir Hugo, who wants him to go into politics. One day in late July 1865, as he is boating on the Thames, Daniel rescues a young Jewish woman, Mirah Lapidoth, from attempting to drown herself. He takes her to the home of some of his friends, where they learn that Mirah is a singer. She has come to London to search for her mother and brother after running away from her father, who had kidnapped her when she was a child and had forced her into an acting troupe. She finally ran away from him after discovering that he had pledged her in marriage to a wealthy patron. Moved by her tale, Daniel undertakes to help her look for her mother (who turns out to have died years earlier) and brother; through this, he is introduced to London's Jewish community. Mirah and Daniel grow closer and Daniel, anxious about his growing affection for her, leaves for a short time to join Sir Hugo in Leubronn, where he and Gwendolen first meet.

From here, the story picks up in "real time". Gwendolen returns from Germany in early September 1865 because her family has lost its fortune. She is unwilling to marry (the only respectable way in which a woman could achieve real financial security); and she is also reluctant to become a governess, because it would drastically lower her social status from being a member of the wealthy landed gentry to being almost a servant. She hits upon the idea of pursuing a career in singing or on the stage, but a prominent musician tells her she does not have the talent. Finally, to save herself and her family from relative poverty, she marries the wealthy Grandcourt, despite having promised Mrs. Glasher she would not, and despite fearing that it is a mistake. She believes she can manipulate him to maintain her freedom to do what she likes; however, Grandcourt has shown every sign of being cold, unfeeling, and manipulative himself.

Daniel, searching for Mirah's family, meets a consumptive visionary named Mordecai. Mordecai passionately proclaims his wish for the Jewish people to retain their national identity and to be restored one day to the Promised Land. Because he is dying, he wants Daniel to become his intellectual heir and continue to pursue his dream to be an advocate for the Jewish people. Although Daniel is strongly drawn to Mordecai, he hesitates to commit himself to a cause that seems to have no connection to his own identity. Daniel's desire to embrace Mordecai's vision becomes stronger when they discover Mordecai is Mirah's brother Ezra. Daniel feels affection and respect for Mordecai/Ezra, but does not feel able to pursue a life of advocacy for Jewish causes, since he does not believe that he himself is a Jew.

Meanwhile, Gwendolen has been emotionally crushed by her cold, self-centred, and manipulative husband. She is consumed with guilt for having possibly disinherited Lydia Glasher's children by marrying their father. On Gwendolen's wedding day, Mrs. Glasher curses her and tells her that she will suffer for her treachery, which only exacerbates Gwendolen's feelings of dread and terror. During this time, Gwendolen and Daniel meet regularly, and Gwendolen pours out her troubles to him at each meeting. During a trip to Italy, Grandcourt is knocked from his boat into the water, and after some hesitation, Gwendolen jumps into the Mediterranean in a futile attempt to save him. She is consumed with guilt because she had long wished he would die and fears her hesitation had caused his death. Coincidentally, Daniel is also in Italy, having learned from Sir Hugo that his mother lives there. He comforts Gwendolen and advises her. Gwendolen is in love with Daniel, and hopes for a future with him, but he urges her onto a path of righteousness, encouraging her to alleviate her suffering by helping others.

Daniel meets his mother and learns that she was a famous Jewish opera singer with whom Sir Hugo was once in love. She tells him that her father, a physician and strict Jew, had forced her to marry her cousin, whom she did not love. She resented the rigid piety of her childhood. Daniel was the only child of that union, and on her husband's death, she asked Sir Hugo to raise her son as an English gentleman, never to know that he was Jewish. Upon learning of his true origins, Daniel finally feels comfortable with his love for Mirah, and on his return to England in October 1866, he tells Mirah this and commits himself to be Ezra/Mordecai's disciple. Before Daniel marries Mirah, he goes to Gwendolen to tell her about his origins, his decision to go to "the East" (per Ezra/Mordecai's wish), and his betrothal to Mirah. Gwendolen is devastated, but it becomes a turning point in her life, inspiring her to finally say, "I shall live." She is aware of the "terrible moment" when "the great movements of the world, the larger destinies of mankind… enter like an earthquake into their own lives". According to A. Sanders: "Gwendolen's is a crisis resultant from 'feeling the pressure of a vast mysterious movement' whose mystery remains unsolved, perhaps unsolvable". She sends Daniel a letter on his wedding day, telling him not to think of her with sadness but to know that she will be a better person for having known him. The newlyweds are all prepared to set off for "the East" with Mordecai, when Mordecai dies in their arms, and the novel ends.

== Characters ==
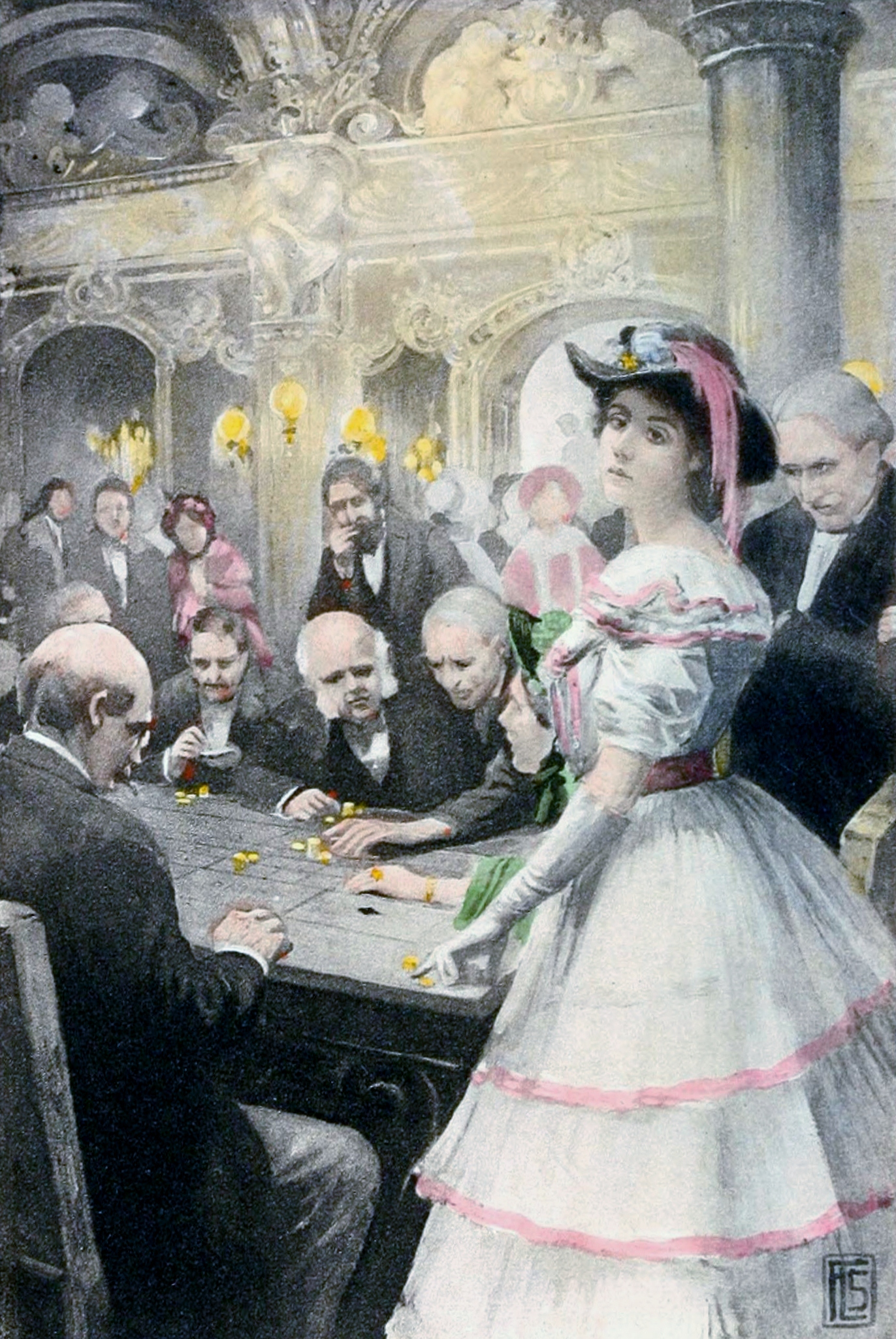
"Gwendolen at the roulette table"

- Daniel Deronda – The ward of the wealthy Sir Hugo Mallinger and hero of the novel, Deronda has a tendency to help others at a cost to himself. At the start of the novel, he has failed to win a scholarship at Cambridge because of his focus on helping a friend, has been travelling abroad, and has just started studying law. He often wonders about his birth and whether or not he is a gentleman. As he moves more and more among the world-within-a-world of the Jews of the novel he begins to identify with their cause in direct proportion to the unfolding revelations of his ancestry. Eliot used the story of Moses as part of her inspiration for Deronda. As Moses was a Jew brought up as an Egyptian who ultimately led his people to the Promised Land, so Deronda is a Jew brought up as an Englishman who ends the novel with a plan to do the same. Deronda's name presumably indicates that his ancestors lived in the Spanish city of Ronda, prior to the expulsion of the Jews from Spain in 1492.
- Gwendolen Harleth – The beautiful, spoiled daughter of a widowed mother. Much courted by men, she is flirtatious but ultimately self-involved. Early in the novel, her family suffers a financial crisis, and she is faced with becoming a governess to help support herself and her family. Seeking an escape, she explores the idea of becoming an actress and singer, but Herr Klesmer tells her that she has started too late, that she does not know the meaning of hard work, training, and sacrifice. Gwendolen marries the controlling and cruel Henleigh Grandcourt, although she does not love him. Desperately unhappy, she seeks help from Deronda, who offers her understanding, moral support and the possibility of a way out of her guilt and sorrow. As a psychological study of an immature egoist struggling to achieve greater understanding of herself and others through suffering, Gwendolen is for many Eliot's crowning achievement as a novelist and the real core of the book. F. R. Leavis famously felt that the novel would have benefited from the complete removal of the Jewish section and the renaming of it as Gwendolen Harleth. It is true that though the novel is named after Deronda, a greater proportion is devoted to Gwendolen than to Deronda himself.
- Mirah Lapidoth – A beautiful Jewish girl who was born in England but taken away by her father at a young age to travel the world as a singer. Realising, as a young woman, that her father planned to sell her as a mistress to a European nobleman, to get money for his gambling addiction, she flees from him and returns to London to look for her mother and brother. When she arrived in London she found her old home destroyed and no trace of her family. Giving in to despair, she tries to commit suicide. Rescued by Daniel, she is cared for by his friends while searching for her family and work, so that she can support herself.
- Sir Hugo Mallinger – A wealthy gentleman; Sir Hugo fell in love with the operatic diva Maria Alcharisi when she was young and agreed, out of love for her, to raise her son Daniel Deronda.
- Henleigh Mallinger Grandcourt – Sir Hugo's nephew and heir-presumptive, a wealthy, manipulative, sadistic man. Grandcourt marries Gwendolen Harleth and then embarks upon a campaign of emotional abuse. He has a mistress, Lydia Glasher, with whom he has several children. He had promised to marry Lydia when her husband died but reneged on the promise to marry Gwendolen instead.
- Thomas Cranmer Lush – Henleigh Grandcourt's slavish associate. He and Gwendolen take an immediate dislike to one another.
- Lydia Glasher – Henleigh Grandcourt's mistress, a fallen woman who left her husband for Grandcourt and had his children. She confronts Gwendolen, hoping to persuade her not to marry Grandcourt and protect her children's inheritance. To punish both women, Grandcourt takes the family diamonds he had given to Lydia and gives them to Gwendolen. He forces Gwendolen to wear them despite her knowing that they had been previously worn by his mistress.
- Ezra Mordecai Cohen – Mirah's brother. A young Jewish visionary suffering from consumption who befriends Daniel Deronda and teaches him about Judaism. A Kabbalist and proto-Zionist, Mordecai sees Deronda as his spiritual successor and inspires him to continue his vision of creating a homeland for the Jews in Palestine. Named after the biblical character Mordecai, who delivers the Jews from the machinations of Haman in the Book of Esther
- Herr Julius Klesmer – A German-Jewish musician in Gwendolen Harleth's social circle; Klesmer marries Catherine Arrowpoint, a wealthy girl with whom Gwendolen is friendly. He also advises Gwendolen not to try for a life on the stage. Thought to be partly based on Franz Liszt or Anton Rubinstein.
- The Princess Halm Eberstein – Daniel Deronda's mother. The daughter of a physician, she suffered under her father's dominance; he saw her main purpose was to produce Jewish sons. To please him, she agreed to marry her cousin, knowing he adored her and would let her do as she wished after her father died. When her father was dead, she became a renowned singer and actress. After her husband died, she gave her son to Sir Hugo Mallinger to be raised as an English gentleman, free of all the disadvantages she felt she had had as a Jew. Later when her voice seemed to be failing, she converted to Christianity to marry a Russian nobleman. Her voice recovered, and she bitterly regretted having given up her life as a performer. Now ill with a fatal disease, she begins to fear retribution for having frustrated her father's plans for his grandson. She contacts Daniel through Sir Hugo, asking him to meet her in Genoa, where she travels under pretense of consulting a doctor. Their confrontation in Italy is one of the novel's important scenes. Afterwards, she tells Deronda where he can recover a chest full of important documents related to his Jewish heritage, gathered by her father.

== The depiction of Jews ==
Eliot's book was the first novel in English fiction where "Jewish figures were cast in a favorable light, and as nationalists." It contrasted strongly with that of other Victorian novelists, such as Charles Dickens in Oliver Twist. Even though Britain had a Jewish-born Prime Minister at the time of the novel's publication (Benjamin Disraeli was baptised as a child into the Church of England after his father renounced Judaism), the view of Jews among non-Jewish Britons at the time was often prejudiced, sometimes to the point of derision or revulsion. In 1833 when the Jewish Civil Disabilities Bill came before Parliament the whole force of the Tory Party and the personal antagonism of King William IV was against the bill, which is reflected in opinions expressed by several of the non-Jewish Meyrick family in Chapter 32.

=== Influence on Jewish Zionism ===
On its publication, Daniel Deronda was immediately translated into German and Dutch and was given an enthusiastic extended review by the Austrian Zionist rabbi and scholar David Kaufmann. Further translations soon followed into French (1882), Italian (1883), Hebrew (1893), Yiddish (1900s) and Russian (1902).

Written during a time when Restorationism (similar to 20th-century Christian Zionism) had a strong following, Eliot's novel had a positive influence on later Jewish Zionism. It has been cited by Henrietta Szold, Eliezer Ben-Yehuda, and Emma Lazarus as having been influential in their decision to become Zionists. According to American novelist Ruchama Feuerman, Lazarus, the Jewish poet of Statue of Liberty fame, became a passionate Zionist after reading Daniel Deronda; it was the go-to novel for budding Zionist leaders, like Chaim Weizmann, David Ben-Gurion, and others; Golda Meir kept the novel near her bed; the book lit a fire under university student Ben-Yehuda who went on to devote his life to reviving ancient Hebrew and shaping it for usage in modern day Israel; and most crucially, Eliot’s novel spurred the first Zionist group of Jews, Hovavei Tzion, to sail to Ottoman Palestine in the 1880s.

== Plot structure ==
In 1948, F. R. Leavis in The Great Tradition gave the opinion that the Jewish sections of the book were its weakest, and that a truncated version called Gwendolen Harleth should be printed on its own. Conversely, some Zionist commentators have advocated the opposite truncation, keeping the Jewish section, with Gwendolen's story omitted.

Contemporary readers might ask themselves whether the seemingly bifurcated structure of the novel arose from a wish to contrast inward-looking (Gwendolen) and outward-looking (Deronda, on the Jewish 'question') moral growth, with Deronda himself the fulcrum.

== Adaptations ==
=== Books ===
An abridged (119 page) version for younger readers, by Philip Zimmerman, focusing on the Jewish elements, was published in 1961 by Herzl Press.

=== Films ===
Film adaptations include:

- Gwendolin (1914), an American short film directed by Travers Vale.
- Daniel Deronda (1921), a British silent drama film starring Reginald Fox, Ann Trevor and Clive Brook. Walter Courtney Rowden made the film at Teddington Studios by Master Films.
- Daniel Deronda (1970), a six-episode BBC TV drama written by Alexander Baron, produced by David Conroy and directed by Joan Craft. John Nolan starred as Daniel Deronda, with Martha Henry as Gwendolen and Robert Hardy as Grandcourt.
- Daniel Deronda (2002), a four-episode BBC One serial drama written by Andrew Davies, directed by Tom Hooper and starring Hugh Dancy in the title role. The show won two British Academy Television Craft Awards, a Banff Rockie Award, and a Broadcasting Press Guild Award.
