= Winnifred =

Winnifred is a given name.

== People ==
Notable people with the name include:

- Winnifred Eaton (1875–1954), Canadian author
- Winnifred Harper Cooley (1874–1967), American author and lecturer
- Winnifred Hudson (1905–1996), British-born painter
- Winnifred Jong, Canadian filmmaker
- Winnifred Quick (1904–2002), one of the last four remaining survivors of the sinking of RMS Titanic on April 15, 1912, one of the last two remaining survivors to have memory of the crash, sinking, and escape.
- Winnifred Sprague Mason Huck (1882–1936), American journalist and politician from the state of Illinois
- Winnifred Sarah Train (1904–1979), New Zealand army nurse, hospital matron, nurses' association leader
- Winnifred Teo Suan Lie (1967–-1985), Singaporean student and victim of an unsolved rape-murder case
- Winnifred Wygal (1884–1972), American theological writer, lecturer, YWCA leader

== Fictional Characters ==
- Winnifred Torrance, Protagonist of Stephen King's 1977 novel, The Shining, and Stanley Kubrick's 1980 homonymous film, The Shining.
- Winnifred Banks, a character in the 1964 Disney film Mary Poppins, portrayed by Glynis Johns.
- Princess Winnifred the Woebegone, the protagonist of the musical Once Upon a Mattress, based on the fairy tale "The Princess and the Pea."
- Winnifred Sanderson, one of the three Sanderson sisters in the Disney film Hocus Pocus and its sequel Hocus Pocus 2.
- Winnifred (aka Winnie), an artificial intelligence associated with the Department of Clarification in the Isaac Steele and the Forever Man series by Daniel Rigby.

== Places ==
- Winnifred, Alberta, hamlet in the Canadian province of Alberta
- Winnifred Street Bridge (also known asWSDOT Bridge No. 1130), concrete box girder bridge in Ruston, Washington

== See also ==
- Winifred (disambiguation)
