= Gwenn Seemel =

American painter

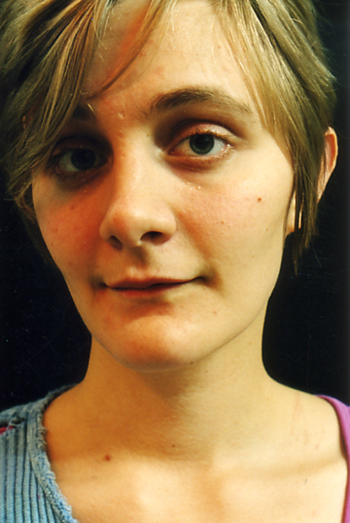
- Known for: Painting, drawing

Gwenn Seemel (born 1981) is an American painter. She paints contemporary portraits and releases her work under free licenses.

== Personal life and education ==
Seemel lives and works in Long Beach Island, New Jersey in the United States.

== Career ==
Seemel mainly paints portraits. When she paints a portrait, she takes photographs, for an hour, of the sitter before painting them. The sitter is asked to talk about themselves during the photography session. Seemel creates the painting from the photographs. The paintings consist of "geometric patterns and layers of color." Seemel cites printmaking as an inspiration for her painting technique. Seemel painted a portrait of Randy Leonard in 2009, which was displayed in the Portland City Hall. Campaign money was used to buy the painting. Her 2009 exhibition, "Apple Pie," featured portraits of Superman, Susan B. Anthony and Elvis Presley. In 2010, Seemel partnered with artist Becca Bernstein to create their version of portraits of ten subjects. Subjects included family members and the artists themselves. A 2012 exhibition called "Crime Against Nature," includes paintings of animals that don't fit into the gender binary such as dolphins and squirrels.

Seemel releases her work under a free license, and encourages the remixing, use, and sharing of her work.

== See also ==
- Anti-copyright
- Criticism of intellectual property
