= Gwenn Flowers =

Glaciologist

- Born: USA

Academic background
- Education: BA, Physics, University of Colorado; Ph.D, Earth and Ocean Sciences, 2000, University of British Columbia
- Thesis: A multicomponent coupled model of glacier hydrology. (2000)

Academic work
- Institutions: Simon Fraser University

Gwenn Elizabeth Flowers is a Canadian/American glaciologist. She is a professor in the Department of Earth Sciences at Simon Fraser University (SFU) and an adjunct professor at the University of Iceland. As a Canada Research Chair from 2005–2014, she established a research program dedicated to the geophysical study of glaciers.

== Early life and education ==
Flowers was born and raised in the United States, and she credits her father and a few teachers in junior high and high school for encouraging her interests in science, math, and nature. She earned her Bachelor of Science degree in physics from the University of Colorado in 1994 and travelled to Canada to earn her PhD in Earth and Ocean Sciences from the University of British Columbia.

== Career ==
After four years of postdoctoral work at the University of Iceland and UBC, Flowers joined the faculty at Simon Fraser University (SFU) where she continued to study glaciers in western Canada. She was appointed a Tier 2 Canada Research Chair in 2005 to study how glaciers and icecaps were affected by global warming and other climate changes. The position allowed her to travel to the Saint Elias Mountains and study the variability of glacial change in neighbouring mountain ranges with different microclimates. As a result of her research, Flowers received one of three 2006 Outstanding Young Scientist award from the European Geosciences Union. She studied the Saint Elias Mountains for five years with a team of four to six researchers, taking turns staying at the Traditional Territory of the Kluane First Nation, in the co-managed Kluane National Park and Reserve for two to four weeks. In 2010, Flowers' Canada Research Chair was renewed for another five year term and she was recruited by Dr. Gifford Miller to conduct research on the melting of the Barnes Ice Cap.

In 2018, she was appointed Chair of the International Glaciological Society's Publications Committee while continuing her research in southwest Yukon. Her research team began mapping the Kaskawulsh Glacier and its reaction towards warming climate and diminishing snow cover. Her research team used a radar box to send signals into the glacier's core to find ice within it. In 2024, she was awarded the Julia and Johannes Weertman medal for her research on glacier hydrology. Most recently, she has contributed to published work in 2026 related to glacier surging and hazards related to glacial surging.
