= Gwendalyn =

Gwendalyn is a given name.

== People with the given name ==
- Gwendalyn J. Randolph, American immunologist
- Gwendalyn Gibson, American professional mountain bike rider
- Gwendalyn F. Cody (1922–2021), American politician

== See also ==
- Gwen
- Gwendal
