= Gwendolen Harleth =

Fictional character in George Eliot's 1876 novel Daniel Deronda

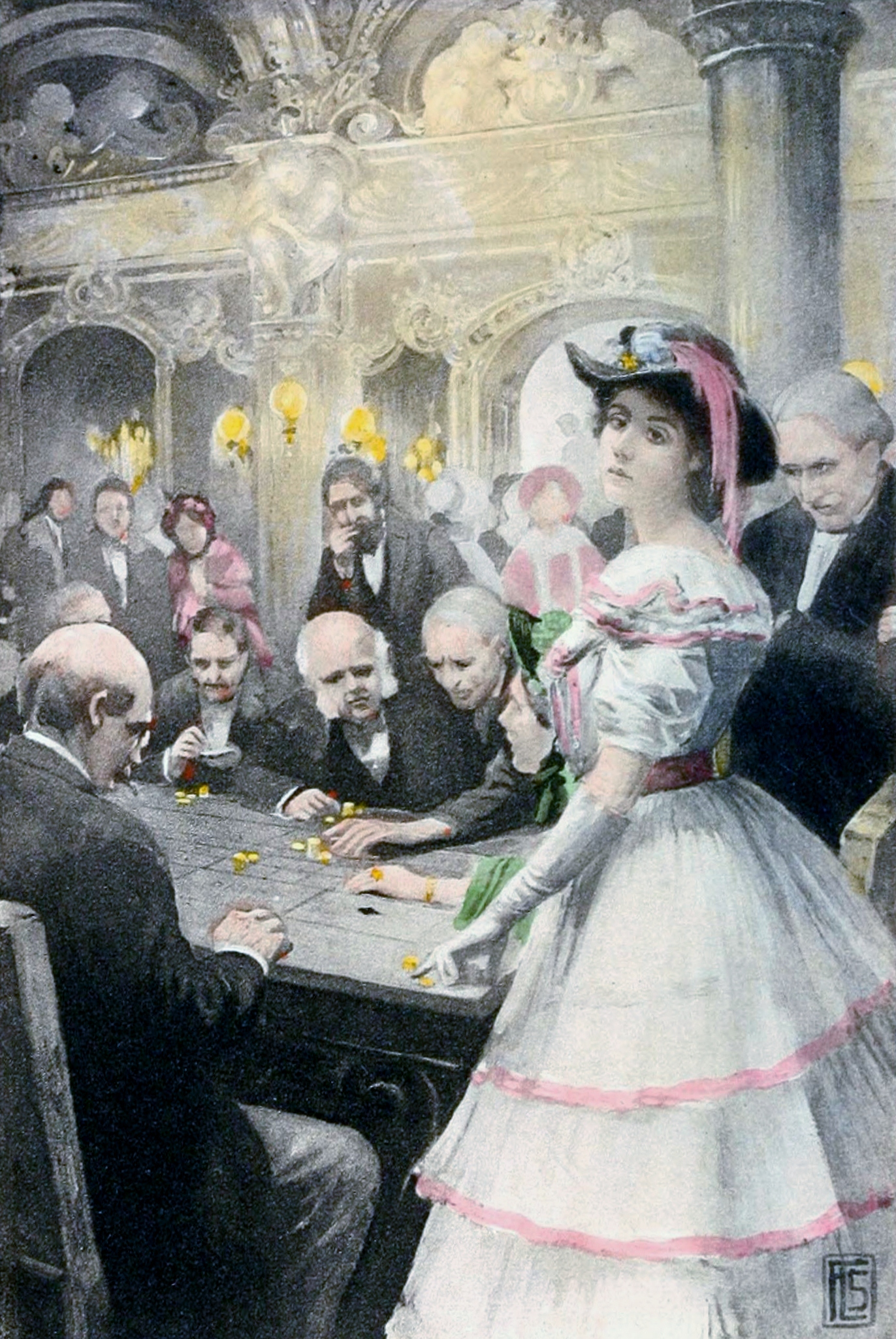
- 1910 illustration of "Gwendolen at the roulette table"
- First appearance: Daniel Deronda
- Created by: George Eliot

In-universe information
- Gender: Female
- Title: Lady
- Spouse: Henleigh Grandcourt

Gwendolen Harleth, later Gwendolen Grandcourt, is a central character in George Eliot's 1876 novel Daniel Deronda. She acts as a foil to Mirah Lapidoth.

== Biography ==
Gwendolen Harleth is beautiful and wilful, desired by many men, a fact which she revels in. However, her family falls on hard times soon after the novel begins. It becomes the once proud Gwendolen's fate to work as a governess to support herself and her family. She desperately tries to escape that fate, and explores the possibility of working on the stage as an actress. She is sorely disabused of that notion, when she learns that beauty and charm alone are not enough to gain her followers on the stage— it requires years of training and hard work. Unable to bear the idea of being a governess, Gwendolen decides to marry the abusive, authoritarian Henleigh Mallinger Grandcourt—though she had promised his mistress, Lydia Glasher, that she would not do so, since that would disinherit the children Glasher has with Grandcourt. Glasher had previously left her husband for Grandcourt, and had also been given promises of marriage, but he has never kept his word. Eliot says of Gwendolen, "It was not that she wished to damage men, it was only that she wished not to be damaged by them".

Gwendolen and Grandcourt have an unhappy marriage, and Gwendolen is racked by guilt when Grandcourt drowns, as she had been wishing for him to die and hesitated for a moment before trying to save him. Grandcourt had recently made a new will, in which he left the majority of his fortune and estates to his son by Mrs. Glasher, if his marriage to Gwendolen did not produce a male heir. He created the new will specifically in an effort to coerce Gwendolen to do her wifely duty with him to produce a legitimate and male heir.

Throughout her ordeals, Daniel Deronda acts as a moral guide. He buys back jewellery she has pawned when she becomes impoverished, and he counsels her when she is distressed about the state of her marriage to Grandcourt and her actions vis a vis Lydia Glasher and her children. When she is uncertain what to do when she is widowed, he encourages her to do good.

== Onscreen portrayals ==
Daniel Deronda has been adapted for the screen twice. The first time, in 1921, Gwendolen was played by Dorothy Fane. The second version, a BBC serialisation from 2002, has Romola Garai as Gwendolen.
