= Gwendoline (disambiguation) =

Gwendoline is a feminine given name.

Gwendoline may also refer to:

- Gwendoline (opera), an 1886 opera by Emmanuel Chabrier
- Gwendoline (sternwheeler), a sternwheel steamer on the Kootenay River in British Columbia
- Gwendoline Steers, a tugboat launched in 1888
- Sweet Gwendoline, a character created by fetish artist John Willie
  - The Perils of Gwendoline in the Land of the Yik-Yak, a 1984 film by Just Jaeckin
- St Gwendoline's (Welsh: Gwenddolen [ɡwɛnˈðoˑlɛn]), churches in Llyswen and Talgarth, Wales
