= Winnie (website) =

Online childcare marketplace

Winnie, Inc.
- Company type: Private
- Founders: Sara Mauskopf; Anne Halsall
- Industry: Internet * Software * Parenting
- Employees: Under 25
- Website: winnie.com

Winnie is a San Francisco-based marketplace for child care that helps parents find childcare, preschool, and early education. The company was founded in 2016 by Sara Mauskopf and Anne Halsall.

== History ==
The Winnie iPhone app was founded by Sara Mauskopf and Anne Halsall and launched in June 2016. In October 2016, Winnie announced that it raised $2.5 million in seed funding. In May 2017, Winnie launched a daycare and preschool finder.

In 2018, Winnie began expanding nationwide, allowing parents to find childcare options across the United States.

By 2019, Winnie had comprehensive databases in California, Texas, New York, and Illinois.

During the COVID-19 pandemic, Winnie provided emergency childcare options for essential workers.

In October 2019, Winnie secured $9 million in Series A funding. The funding was intended to support the platform’s expansion, which provides information on daycare and preschool options across more than 7,000 U.S. cities.

Starting in 2020, Winnie expanded its offerings to include searches for school-age childcare.

During the U.S. childcare staffing crisis in 2022, Winnie launched a job board tailored to daycare and preschool roles to help address staffing needs. In 2022, it introduced a dedicated search for special needs childcare. In the same year, Winnie introduced Winnie Pro, a SaaS solution that allows childcare providers to manage and scale their businesses with better-paying opportunities.

In 2023, Winnie expanded its search functionality to include alternative care types, such as au pairs and summer care. Parents can search for camp options in their area and access detailed information to make informed decisions.

== Awards and recognition ==
Winnie received Inc. magazine's "Best Workplaces" award in both 2022 and 2021.

In 2023, Winnie ranked #177 on the Inc. 5000 list of the fastest-growing private companies in the U.S. and secured the #1 spot in the Consumer Services category and #34 in California.

In 2024, Winnie was named a key company in the childcare industry by Grand View Research.

== Services ==
The Winnie app contains data about child care providers including descriptions, photos, tuition information, licensing status, and availability data.

Parents also use Winnie to ask questions and share their experiences.
