= Murder of Wendy Wolin =

U.S. unsolved child murder case

Wendy Wolin
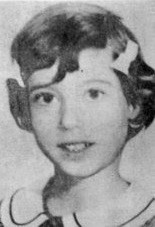
- Wendy Wolin, c. 1966
- Born: Wendy Sue Wolin; August 20, 1958
- Died: March 8, 1966 (aged 7); Elizabeth, New Jersey, U.S.
- Cause of death: Shock and hemorrhage due to stab wound to abdomen
- Resting place: Beth Israel Cemetery and Mausoleum, Woodbridge Township, New Jersey; 40.55164°N 74.31139°W (approximate)
- Citizenship: United States
- Occupation: Student
- Known for: Victim of unsolved child murder

The murder of Wendy Wolin is an unsolved child murder which occurred in Elizabeth, New Jersey, on the afternoon of March 8, 1966, in which a seven-year-old girl was stabbed to death with a hunting knife by a lone, middle-aged male while walking along a street less than 1,000 feet from her home. Initially, Wolin believed she had been punched by her murderer, although she soon lapsed into a state of shock from the single stab wound inflicted to her abdomen. She died of her wound less than one hour later. Despite extensive contemporary and subsequent police efforts, her murderer was never identified, and Wolin's murder remains unsolved. The investigation into Wolin's murder is considered a cold case.

The extensive manhunt to identify and apprehend Wolin's murderer has been described by one journalist as one of the largest in New Jersey history. The murder itself has also been described as a crime which "robbed [Elizabeth] of its innocence."

== Early life ==
Wendy Sue Wolin was born on August 20, 1958 in New Jersey, the second of two children born to Richard and Shirley (née Rubinstein) Wolin. Her father was a businessman, and her mother a teacher. She had one older sister, Jodi Ann (b. April 22, 1955). The family followed the Jewish faith, and were reasonably wealthy, with the sisters initially raised in a house owned by their grandparents in the borough of Highland Park.

Wendy's parents divorced when she was a small child; her mother later married a businessman named Martin Fleischner in March 1965. Shortly prior to the wedding, the family relocated to an upscale apartment within the Pierce Manor apartment building upon Irvington Avenue in the Westminster neighborhood of Elizabeth.

== March 8, 1966 ==
At approximately 4 p.m. on March 8, 1966, Wendy and her mother exited the front door of their apartment with view for the pair to go shopping before collecting Wendy's sister, Jodi, from a local Hebrew school and returning home. According to contemporary police reports, as Wendy's mother walked to the rear of the house to collect her car from a parking lot at the rear of the property, Wendy—clutching her purse containing a quarter she intended to spend—walked along the sidewalk of Irvington Avenue in the direction of the intersection with Prince Street, where she was to wait for her mother to drive and collect her.

"He asked me, 'How do you get downtown?' Then he walked past me, and I turned around and I looked for my niece, and I saw him bent over this little girl ... I said to the little girl, 'What's the matter?' She said, 'He punched me, the man punched me.'"

— Eyewitness recollection of the events immediately prior to and following Wolin's stabbing, as recollected to a New York Times journalist (1995)

=== Stabbing ===
As Wendy walked along Irvington Avenue, she encountered a stocky, middle-aged man wearing a three-quarter length green corduroy coat and fedora, himself walking toward her from the opposite direction. When this individual was just inches from Wendy as the two stood at the front of a residential driveway close to a busy intersection less than 1,000 feet from her home, he suddenly crouched down until he was almost at eye level with the child and wordlessly thrust a cheap hunting knife with a four-inch blade through her coat and into the side of her abdomen, causing Wendy to double over and scream in pain as the man stood up and began hastily walking in the direction of Prince Street.

Initially, the child believed she had been punched in the abdomen as she cried out in pain, briefly staggered, then slumped to her knees clutching her stomach. Her assailant kept walking as three teenage girls and a woman—having witnessed the incident and also believing Wendy had been violently punched—ran across the road into the Elizabeth Fire Department, where they informed a fireman named Edward Deignan what they had seen. Deignan ran to assist Wendy, who stated she had been punched in the stomach as she remained doubled over—clutching her stomach in pain. She was then assisted into the fire station and seated on a chair. Moments later, she began to slide from the chair to the ground, whereupon one of the firefighters opened the child's coat to reveal the severe knife wound inflicted to her abdomen. Wendy was able to provide Deignan with her name and address and to state she did not know her attacker although almost immediately thereafter, she entered an acute state of shock. (Note: In an effort to keep Wendy calm, upon discovering her stab wound, Deignan did not inform the child she had been stabbed.)

==== Medical efforts ====
Emergency responders were immediately notified as to Wendy's injuries. The first two officers to arrive at the scene, Charles Williams and Peter Melchione, arrived at the fire station minutes later, where they observed the child lying on a desk as firefighters attempted to administer first aid. Although an ambulance had already been summoned, the two officers immediately drove the child to Elizabeth General Hospital in their patrol car—notifying staff in advance of their impending arrival with a child casualty with a severe abdominal stab wound.

Williams would later recollect the events immediately upon their arrival at Elizabeth General Hospital: "When we got there, the doctor came over and opened the door of the police car and he saw [Melchione holding Wendy], blood all over. And this part I will never forget: The doctor looked at me, and he put his head down—he knew. She wasn't dead at that time, but he knew, and I was just ... it was just the hardest thing."

=== Death ===
A team of six physicians frantically attempted to save Wendy's life. These surgeons discovered the knife wound had penetrated her ribs, lacerated her liver and pierced her right lung. Despite efforts to save Wendy's life, she was pronounced dead at 5:15 p.m.—less than one hour after her admission. Her subsequent autopsy listed her cause of death as being due to shock and hemorrhage.

By the time Wendy's mother drove onto Irvington Avenue, the child had already been taken into the local fire station. As she drove around the streets looking for her child, a neighbor flagged down her car to inform her the police had just spoken with her husband about an incident involving her daughter and were looking to speak with her. Upon being informed by police that Wendy had been taken to the Elizabeth General Hospital, Shirley drove to the hospital to be informed by her husband that Wendy had died.

== Funeral ==
Wendy Wolin was laid to rest within the Beth Israel Cemetery and Mausoleum in Woodbridge Township, New Jersey, on March 9, 1966, following a service officiated by Rabbi Gershon Chertoff and attended by approximately two hundred mourners. At her parents' request, she was dressed in a pink and white party dress. Her gravestone bears the inscription "Beloved Daughter-Sister-Granddaughter" in addition to two hearts, the Star of David, and text in both English and Hebrew.

== Initial investigation ==
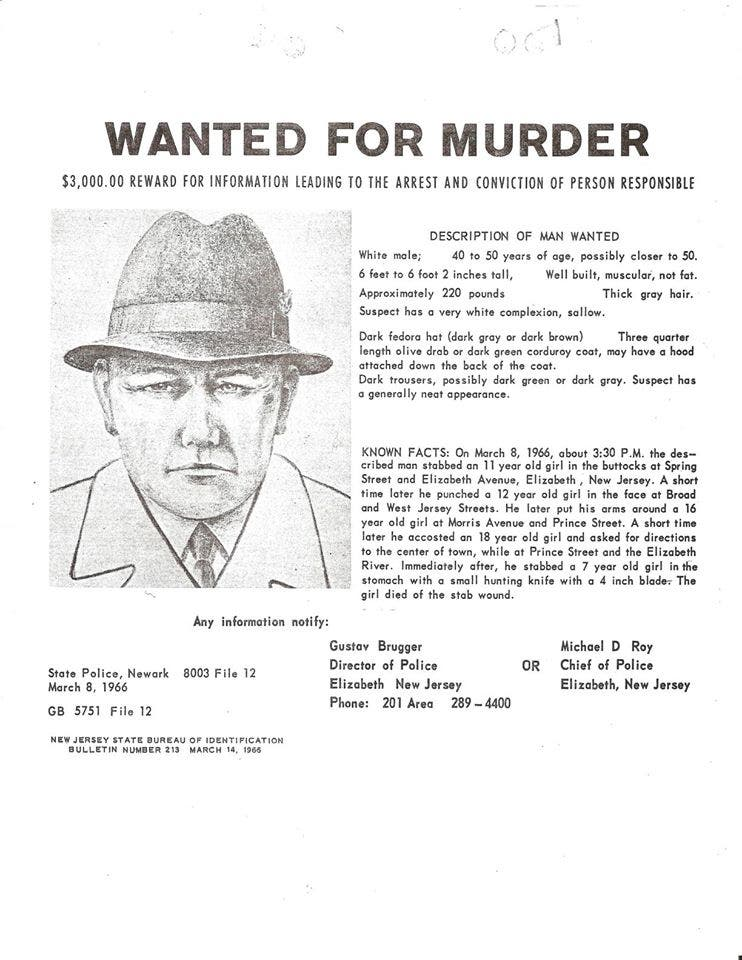
March 14, 1966 New Jersey State Police facial composite of the individual responsible for Wolin's murder

The random and seemingly motiveless murder of Wendy Wolin shocked and outraged the community, and numerous officers were assigned full-time to the case, with senior investigators publicly vowing the manhunt would continue unabated until the perpetrator was arrested. (Note: The Elizabeth Police Department consisted of 254 uniformed officers at the time of Wendy Wolin's murder.) Investigators conducted extensive door-to-door inquiries in addition to questioning of members of the public traveling upon public transport networks, and thousands of wanted posters were distributed throughout the city and disseminated to every police department in the country. (Note: The population of Elizabeth in 1966 was approximately 107,000. The size of the city was thirteen square miles.) A telephone hotline number was also established and extensively publicized to encourage anonymous public tips; this hotline ultimately received more than 2,000 leads—all of which failed to bear fruit. Statewide media also devoted extensive publicity to the case, with the Mayor of Elizabeth, Thomas Dunn, also announcing a reward of $3,500 (the equivalent of approximately $35,010 as of 2026) for any information leading to the successful arrest of the perpetrator in addition to conducting several public appeals for information via television and radio.

The manhunt to identify Wendy's murderer would ultimately expand nationwide, and more than 1,500 men—including sex offenders, inmates of mental institutions, and vagrants—would ultimately be questioned throughout the inquiry. Many were eliminated as suspects. Also questioned were all military personnel aboard a Vietnam-bound military ship docked in the Port Newark–Elizabeth Marine Terminal at the time of Wendy's murder—all were eliminated as suspects upon verification of their alibis.

=== Potential further assaults ===
Within the hour prior to Wendy's fatal stabbing, an individual closely resembling the description of her murderer is known to have violently assaulted two other local schoolgirls less than a mile from the site of Wendy's stabbing. Neither of these attacks were fatal, and investigators were unable to discount Wendy's murderer as the perpetrator of either of these assaults. The first of these two attacks occurred approximately forty-five minutes prior to Wendy's murder; in this incident, a twelve-year-old Catholic schoolgirl named Diana De Nicola was punched in the face as she stood outside a department store on a busy thoroughfare, knocking her onto the ground and causing severe bruising to her right cheek and eye. In the second incident—which occurred just eight minutes prior to Wendy's stabbing—a ten-year-old Linden schoolgirl named Patricia La Volpe was stabbed once in the backside at the corner of Spring Street and Elizabeth Avenue by a man wielding a stick. Although hospitalized, La Volpe made a full recovery.

=== Recovery of murder weapon ===
On the morning of March 9, the hunting knife used to murder Wendy was discovered discarded in a gutter beneath a pickup truck just 300 yards from the site of her murder. This weapon—a cheap model typically sold for $1.50 (the equivalent of approximately $15.05 as of 2026)—was discovered inside its brand new sheath. A forensic examination of the knife revealed no clear fingerprints, although police inquiries revealed one of the numerous local stores which sold this particular knife was just two blocks from the site of Wendy's murder. Questioning of the owner of this store revealed the six knives he had purchased for sale had all been sold in May and June 1965.

=== Composite drawing ===
With assistance from the several witnesses to Wendy's murder, a composite drawing of Wendy's murderer was created and extensively disseminated throughout the media in the weeks following the crime. (Note: As witnesses to Wendy's murder insisted the chief of the Elizabeth Police Department, Michael Roy, bore an uncanny resemblance to the suspect, Roy volunteered to model for the police artist's composite drawing of the suspect.) The image and accompanying description based on these witnesses' recollections depicted and described her killer as being a white male, between 40 and 50 years old (likely closer to 50), with thick, gray hair and between 6 ft (180 cm) and 6 ft 2 in (190 cm) in height. This individual weighed approximately 220 lbs, walked with a slight limp, and had an "extremely pale" and "lifeless" face. This man had worn a dark fedora hat, a green, three-quarter length corduroy coat, dark green or gray trousers, brown shoes and white socks.

One individual to view this composite drawing was a 41-year-old local bus driver named Leon David Yurkus, who informed police a man matching this individual's description had unsuccessfully attempted to board his out-of-service bus as he drove down Prince Street at approximately 4:20 p.m. According to Yurkus, the man had seemed to be in an acute state of euphoria. Although Yurkus remained adamant he would recognize this man if he ever saw him again, he never again encountered this individual.

Despite extensive contemporary police efforts, public appeals, and numerous persons of interest interviewed, Wendy's murder remained unsolved and the case gradually became cold, although all physical evidence was retained.

== Cold case investigation ==
In 1995, a 60-year-old Elizabeth woman, who was not a witness to Wendy's murder, contacted the Elizabeth Police Department to submit a lead which would ultimately result in a renewed investigation into the crime pertaining to a new suspect. The woman had seen a man at a wake in Elizabeth whom, she stated, had molested her as a child. Upon seeing this man, memories of the abuse she had suppressed resurfaced, and she realized he closely resembled the contemporary composite drawing of Wendy's murderer.

The tip led investigators to an unmarried Union County resident in his mid-70s who was originally from Elizabeth and had lived ten miles from Irvington Avenue in 1966. This individual—who had an extensive history of mental illness—had not previously been interviewed in relation to Wendy's murder, and an investigation into his movements on the day of the crime revealed he had not reported for work, but had informed his employers he was ill and unable to attend work. He willingly submitted to questioning, and freely admitted that in the mid-1960s he owned and frequently wore a gray fedora and dark green coat. The suspect was interrogated intensely and, having secured the services of a lawyer, submitted to two polygraph tests, both of which he passed.

From relatives of this individual, investigators were able to procure a photograph of the suspect that had been taken in 1966; this image was placed in a photographic lineup which investigators displayed to five eyewitnesses to Wendy's murder. Three of these witnesses were absolutely sure that the image depicted the same man, although the other two were uncertain. Nonetheless, this individual continued to maintain his innocence, and without a confession, there was little police could do to keep the man in custody, as the remainder of their evidence against him largely consisted of witness testimony pertaining to an event which had taken place three decades earlier and circumstantial evidence as opposed to actual physical evidence. (Note: DNA testing of Wendy's clothing conducted in the 2010s failed to yield a profile of her assailant.) As such, this individual was released without charge. He died of natural causes in 1998 at the age of 76, with no formal charges ever brought against him.

=== Potential link to Rubenstein murders ===
In 2016, following the creation of a social media campaign aimed at raising awareness of Wendy's unsolved murder in the hope of generating fresh leads, a woman named Beth Moroney reported she was certain she recognized the composite sketch of Wendy's killer as depicting the same man she had seen on the same day that her friend, 11-year-old Mae Rubenstein and her 41-year-old mother, Anne, were stabbed to death inside their home on South 3rd Avenue on February 13, 1965. Both had received numerous stab and slash wounds and both were deceased at the time of the discovery of their bodies. Neither had been sexually assaulted, and no money or valuables had been stolen from the property. No definitive motive for the murders has ever been established. Nonetheless, investigators have never officially connected these unsolved cases to the same perpetrator.

Her pictures came down; they were tucked away. Never said a word, never mentioned Wendy's birthday ... My mother was very secretive, because I think she was just living in such pain and agony.

— Jodi Wolin, describing the effect of her sister's murder upon her mother and stepfather (2016).

== Aftermath ==
In accordance with Jewish traditions, Wendy Wolin was buried within twenty-four hours of her death. The date of her funeral coincided with the first anniversary of her mother and stepfather's wedding. Her mother and stepfather never celebrated the occasion, and almost never mentioned Wendy's name.

The Pierce Manor Apartments, where Wendy and her family had moved to one year prior to her murder, gradually deteriorated in condition in the decades following her death. These apartment buildings were later renamed the Oakwood Plaza Apartments.

On October 13, 2016, a small rock garden containing an assortment of rocks and flowers was unveiled at the site of Wendy Wolin's murder. This rock garden was formally dedicated to Wendy's life and legacy. Her sister, Jodi, and stepbrother, Jules Fleischner, were both present at this ceremony. A stone marker simply reading "Wendy's Garden" is located close toward the center of the garden.

== See also ==
- Cold case
- Crime in New Jersey
- List of murdered American children
- List of unsolved murders (1900–1979)

== Cited works and further reading ==
- Douglas, John; Olshaker, Mark (2012). The Cases That Haunt Us. New York: Scribner. ISBN 978-0-743-21239-7.
- Halber, Deborah (2014). The Skeleton Crew: How Amateur Sleuths Are Solving America's Cold Cases. Cambridge: Cambridge University Press. ISBN 978-1-107-04145-5.
- Holmes, Ronald M.; Holmes, Stephen T. (2002). Profiling Violent Crimes: An Investigative Tool. Los Angeles: Sage Publications. ISBN 978-0-761-92594-1.
- Innes, Brian (2000). Bodies of Evidence. London: Amber Books Ltd. ISBN 978-1-856-05623-6.
- Katz, Hélèna (2010). Cold Cases: Famous Unsolved Mysteries, Crimes, and Disappearances in America. Santa Barbara: Greenwood Publishing Group. ISBN 978-0-313-37692-4.
- Newton, Michael (2004). The Encyclopedia of Unsolved Crimes. New York City: Checkmark Books. ISBN 0-816-04980-7.
- Pettem, Silvia (2013). Cold Case Research: Resources for Unidentified, Missing, and Cold Homicide Cases. Boca Raton: CRC Press. ISBN 978-1-466-57053-5.
- Thompson, Emily G. (2018). Unsolved Child Murders: Eighteen American Cases, 1956–1998. North Carolina: McFarland & Company Inc. ISBN 978-1-476-67000-3.
- Tomlinson, Gerald (1994). Murdered in Jersey. New Jersey: Rutgers University Press. ISBN 978-0-813-52078-0.
- Van Alphen, Ernst (2014). Staging the Archive: Art and Photography in the Age of New Media. London: Reaktion Books. ISBN 978-1-780-23414-4.
