= Gwen Heeney =

British ceramist, sculptor and academic

Gwen Heeney (1952–2016) was a British ceramist, sculptor and academic, known particularly for sculptures created from bricks. Her commissioned sculptures stand in locations in Britain.

== Life ==
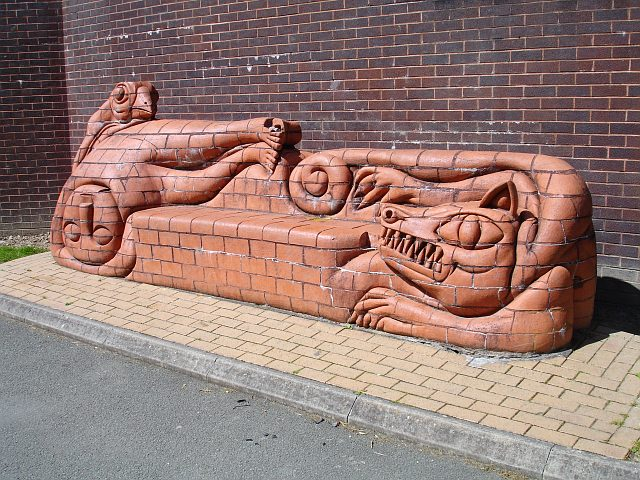
"Taliesin", in Llanfair Caereinion, Wales

Heeney studied ceramics at the School of Art and Design at Bristol Polytechnic from 1971 to 1974. From 1977 to 1986 she had a studio producing domestic pottery, in Cardiff and in mid-Wales. She studied at the Royal College of Art from 1987 to 1989 under Eduardo Paolozzi, gaining an MA, and during 1988 worked in Sweden with Ulla Viotti; after this time she produced large scale works, using architectural brick.

From 1989 she was a research fellow in architectural ceramics at the University of Wales Institute, Cardiff, where she lectured until 1997. From 1998 she was a lecturer in the ceramics department of the University of Wolverhampton. She was a founder member of the World Association of Brick Artists, and a member of the International Academy of Ceramics. She died of cancer in 2016.

== Works ==
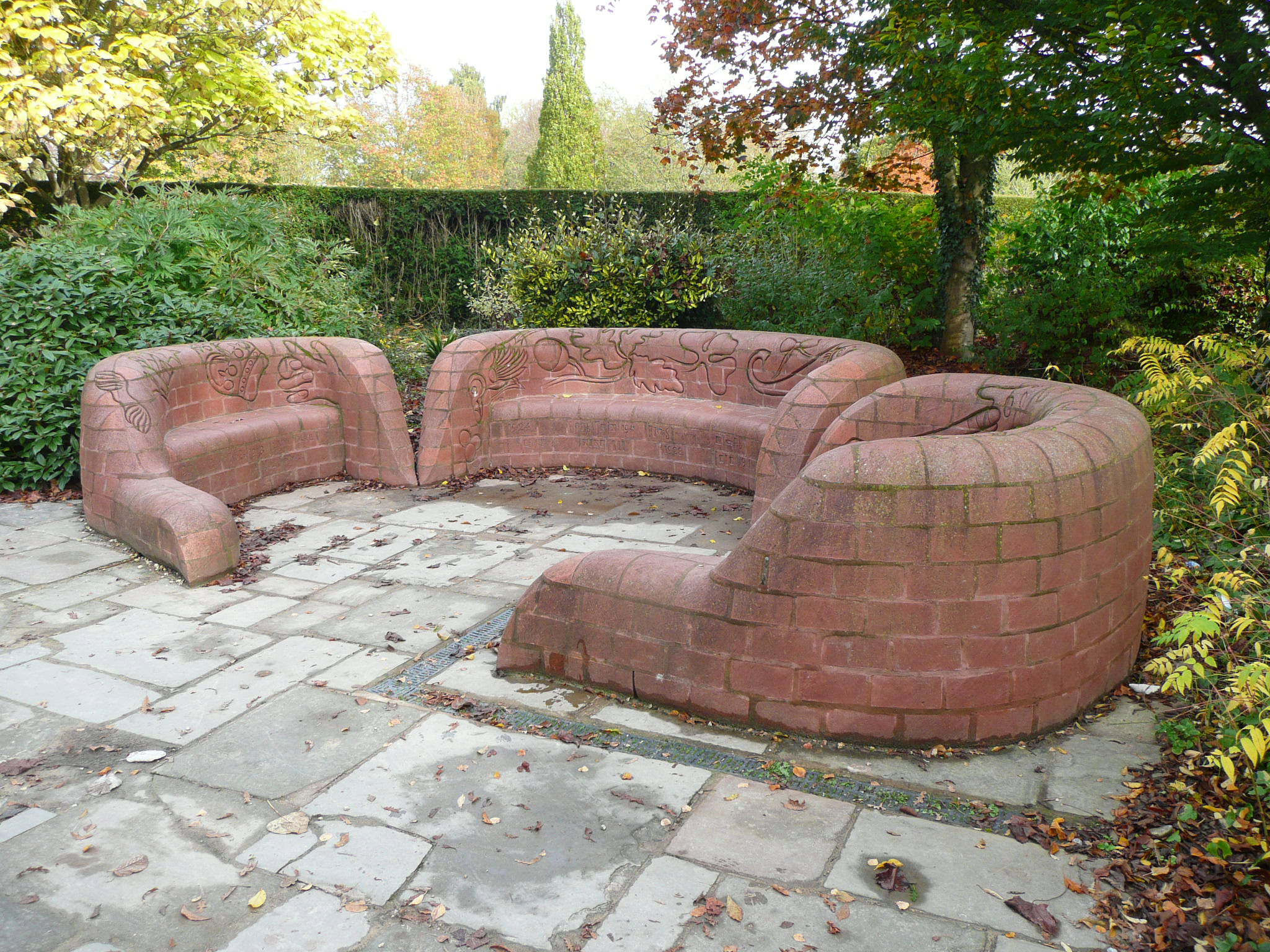
Girl Guiding Nottinghamshire's Centenary Seat, in Rufford Country Park

Heeney's's works include the following:

"Taliesin", in Llanfair Caereinion, was commissioned by Powys County Council and dates from in 1996. It was funded by the Gulbenkian Foundation, the Prince's Trust and North Wales Art. It is a carved brick sculpture, 4.20 metres (13.8 ft) long and 1.50 metres (4 ft 11 in) high, inspired by a folk-tale in the Book of Taliesin.

"Bid Ben Bid Bont" is in the grounds of Llanfyllin High School, Powys, where the artist ran workshops with the pupils. It was commissioned by the Arts Council of Wales, and is a brick sculpture dating from 1999, 13.20 metres (43.3 ft) long and up to 1.75 metres (5 ft 9 in) high. The title is the school's motto, a line from the story of Branwen in the Mabinogion.

The Centenary Seat of Girl Guiding Nottinghamshire, in Rufford Country Park, Ollerton, commissioned to celebrate 100 years of Girl Guiding in Nottinghamshire, was unveiled in 2010. A large settee and two chairs, made of oversize bricks made by Ibstock Brick, are arranged in a trefoil, the symbol of the guiding movement.

Her book Brickworks was published in 2003.
