= List of storms named Gwen =

The name Gwen has been used for seven tropical cyclones worldwide: four in the Eastern Pacific Ocean, one in the Western Pacific Ocean, and two in the Australian region.

In the Eastern Pacific:

- Hurricane Gwen (1960)
- Tropical Storm Gwen (1968)
- Hurricane Gwen (1972) – Category 3 hurricane, made landfall north of San Diego, California, as a depression
- Tropical Storm Gwen (1976) – remained over the open ocean

In the Western Pacific:

- Typhoon Gwen (1947) (T4707)

In the Australian region:

- Cyclone Gwen (1967)
- Cyclone Gwen (1978)
