= Margaret Moore (novelist) =

Canadian author of romance novels

- Born: Unknown
- Occupation: Novelist
- Writing career
- Period: 1992 – present
- Genre: Historical romance
- Website: www.margaretmoore.com

Margaret Moore is a Canadian author of romance novels.

== Biography ==
The USA Today bestselling author of over 40 historical romance novels and novellas, Margaret Moore graduated with distinction from the University of Toronto with a degree in English literature. She sold her first book, A Warrior's Heart, to Harlequin Historicals in 1991. She has also sold historical romances to Avon Books and a Young Adult historical romance to HarperCollins Children's Books.

Moore has been a Romantic Times Book reviews finalist for Career Achievement in Medieval Historical Romance, won an award for Best Foreign Historical from Affaire de Coeur, and two of her characters have received K.I.S.S. (Knights in Shining Silver) Awards from Romantic Times Book reviews. In 2005, her medieval romance The Unwilling Bride made the USA Today bestseller list. The sequel, Hers To Command, was nominated for a Reviewers' Choice award by SingleTitles.com. Publishers Weekly reviewed it as "touching but predictable romance," though it praised the details of life in the era.

She is also a past president of Toronto Romance Writers.

== Works ==
- A Warrior's Heart – 1992 (Harlequin Historical) ISBN 0-373-28718-6
- China Blossom – 1992 (Harlequin Historical) ISBN 0-373-28749-6
- A Warrior's Quest – 1993 (Harlequin Historical) ISBN 0-373-28775-5
- The Viking – 1993 (Harlequin Historical) – Winner Best Foreign Historical of 1993 from Affaire de Coeur ISBN 0-373-28800-X
- A Warrior's Way – 1994 (Harlequin Historical) ISBN 0-373-28824-7
- Vows – 1994 (Harlequin Historical) ISBN 0-373-28848-4
- The Saxon – 1995 (Harlequin Historical) ISBN 0-373-28868-9
- The Welshman's Way – 1995 (Harlequin Historical) ISBN 0-373-28895-6
- The Norman's Heart – 1995 (Harlequin Historical) ISBN 0-373-28911-1
- The Baron's Quest – 1996 (Harlequin Historical) ISBN 0-373-28928-6
- The Wastrel – 1996 (Harlequin Historical) ISBN 0-373-28944-8
- The Dark Duke – 1997 (Harlequin Historical) ISBN 0-373-28964-2
- The Rogue's Return – 1997 (Harlequin Historical) – Winner of Romantic Times KISS Award ISBN 0-373-28976-6
- A Warrior’s Bride – 1998 (Harlequin Historical) ISBN 0-373-28995-2
- A Warrior’s Honor – 1998 (Harlequin Historical) ISBN 0-373-29020-9
- A Warrior’s Passion – 1998 (Harlequin Historical) ISBN 0-373-29040-3
- A Scoundrel's Kiss – 1999 (Avon Books) ISBN 0-380-80266-X
- The Welshman's Bride – 1999 (Harlequin Historical) ISBN 0-373-29059-4
- A Rogue's Embrace – 2000 (Avon Books) ISBN 0-380-80268-6
- A Warrior’s Kiss – 2000 (Harlequin Historical) ISBN 0-373-29104-3
- The Duke's Desire – 2000 (Harlequin Historical) ISBN 0-373-29128-0
- His Forbidden Kiss – 2001 (Avon Books) ISBN 0-380-81335-1
- The Overlord's Bride – 2001 (Harlequin Historical) ISBN 0-373-29159-0
- The Maiden And Her Knight – 2001 (Avon Books) ISBN 0-380-81336-X
- Tempt Me With Kisses – 2002 (Avon Books) ISBN 0-380-82052-8
- Gwyneth And The Thief – 2002 (HarperCollins Children's Books) – Young Adult ISBN 0-06-447337-6
- A Warrior’s Lady – 2002 (Harlequin Historical) ISBN 0-373-29223-6
- All My Desire – 2002 (Avon Books) ISBN 0-380-82053-6
- Kiss Me Quick – 2003 (Avon Books) ISBN 0-06-052620-3
- In The King's Service – 2003 (Harlequin Historical) ISBN 0-373-29275-9
- Kiss Me Again – 2004 (Avon Books) ISBN 0-06-052621-1
- Bride Of Lochbarr – 2004 (HQN Books) ISBN 0-373-77003-0
- Lord Of Dunkeathe – 2005 (HQN Books) ISBN 0-373-77040-5
- The Unwilling Bride – 2005 (HQN Books) – USA Today Bestseller ISBN 0-373-77065-0
- Hers To Command – 2006 (HQN Books) ISBN 0-373-77095-2
- Hers To Desire – 2006 (HQN Books) ISBN 0-373-77124-X; ISBN 978-0-373-77124-0
- My Lord's Desire – 2007 (HQN Books) ISBN 0-373-77228-9; ISBN 978-0-373-77228-5
- The Notorious Knight – 2007 (HQN Books) ISBN 0-373-77240-8; ISBN 978-0-373-77240-7
- Knave's Honor – 2008 (HQN Books) ISBN 0-373-77245-9; ISBN 978-0-373-77245-2
- A Lover's Kiss - 2008 (Harlequin Historical) ISBN 978-0-373-29508-1
- The Viscount's Kiss - 2009 (Harlequin Historical) ISBN 978-0-373-29557-9
- Highland Rogue, London Miss - 2010 (Harlequin Historical) ISBN 978-0-373-29606-4
- Highland Heiress - 2011 (Harlequin Historical) ISBN 978-0-373-29638-5
- Castle of the Wolf - 2014 (Harlequin Historical) ISBN 978-0-373-29794-8
- Bride for a Knight - 2015 (Harlequin Historical) ISBN 978-0-373-29818-1
- Scoundrel of Dunborough - 2016 (Harlequin Historical) ISBN 978-0-373-29865-5
- Marriage of Rogues - 2017 (Harlequin Historical) ISBN 978-0-373-29917-1

=== Novellas ===
- "Christmas in the Valley" in Mistletoe Marriages, 1994, (Harlequin) ISBN 0-373-83309-1
- "The Twelfth Day of Christmas" in The Knights Of Christmas, 1997, (Harlequin Historical) ISBN 0-373-28987-1
- "The Vagabond Knight" in The Brides Of Christmas, 1999 ISBN 0-373-83417-9, reissued 2005 (Harlequin) ISBN 0-373-77148-7
- "Comfort and Joy" in The Christmas Visit, 2004, (Harlequin Historical) ISBN 0-373-29327-5

=== Books by series ===
==== The Warrior series ====
Harlequin Historical, Medieval Britain

- A Warrior’s Heart – 1992
- A Warrior’s Quest – 1993
- A Warrior’s Way – 1994
- The Welshman's Way – 1995
- The Norman's Heart – 1995
- The Baron's Quest – 1996
- A Warrior’s Bride – 1998
- A Warrior’s Honor – 1998
- A Warrior’s Passion – 1998
- The Welshman's Bride – 1999
- A Warrior’s Kiss – 2000
- The Overlord's Bride – 2001
- A Warrior’s Lady – 2002
- In The King's Service – 2003

==== The Viking series ====
Harlequin Historical, Dark Age Britain

- The Viking – 1993
- The Saxon – 1995

==== Victorian series ====
The Most Unsuitable Men

- The Wastrel – 1996
- The Dark Duke – 1997
- The Rogue's Return – 1997

==== Restoration series ====
Avon Books

- A Scoundrel's Kiss – 1999
- A Rogue's Embrace – 2000
- His Forbidden Kiss – 2001

==== Avon Medieval series ====
Avon Books

- The Maiden And Her Knight – 2001
- Tempt Me With Kisses – 2002
- All My Desire – 2002

==== Regency series ====
Avon Books

- Kiss Me Quick – 2003
- Kiss Me Again – 2004

Harlequin Historical

- A Lover's Kiss - 2008
- The Viscount's Kiss - 2009

==== Brothers-in-Arms series ====
HQN Books, Medieval Scotland and England

- Bride Of Lochbarr – 2004
- Lord Of Dunkeathe – 2005
- The Unwilling Bride – 2005
- Hers To Command – 2006
- Hers To Desire – 2006

==== King John series ====
HQN Books, Medieval Britain

- My Lord's Desire – 2007
- The Notorious Knight – 2007
- Knave's Honor – 2008

==== Knight's Prizes Trilogy ====
Harlequin Historical, Medieval Britain

- Castle of the Wolf - 2014
- Bride for a Knight - 2015
- Scoundrel of Dunborough - 2016
