= Gwen Hall =

American activist (1951–2007)

- Born: May 7, 1951; Chicago, Illinois, U.S.
- Died: August 24, 2007 (aged 56); Seattle, Washington, U.S.
- Occupations: Minister, activist, community organizer

Gwen Hall (May 7, 1951 – August 24, 2007) was an American activist, community organizer, and a minister in the Unity Church. She founded Sojourner Truth Ministries in Seattle in 1995.

== Early life and education ==
Hall was born in Chicago. She graduated from the University of Washington in 1979, with a degree in political science, and earned a master's degree at Seattle University's School of Theology and Ministry.

== Career ==
Hall was a Seattle Pride organizer beginning in the 1970s, and a member of Seattle's Black Lesbian Forum. She was an advertising representative for Seattle Gay News. She co-chaired Marches on Washington for gay rights in 1979 and 1993, and was a fundraiser for the protest in other years. She taught life skills workshops, and she spoke on the impact of HIV/AIDS in Black communities. In 1995, Hall founded the Sojourner Truth Unity Fellowship Church (also known as Sojourner Truth Ministries) on Beacon Hill in Seattle. She said of her work, "I made a commitment, a personal commitment, to do my part so that no one would ever die feeling that God didn't love them." In 2003 she was the first openly gay person to give the opening prayer at Seattle's Martin Luther King Jr. Day event.

== Personal life and legacy ==
Hall was married and divorced as a young woman, and had a son. She came out as a lesbian, and had a longtime relationship with Trina Banks. Rev. Hall also had three grandchildren. She died from heart failure in 2007, at the age of 56. The Reverend Gwen Hall and Lois Peterson Scholarship supports college-bound high school seniors in the American Northwest, including Alaska, who are leaders in the LGBTQ community and have demonstrated financial need.
