= Gwen (given name) =

- Gender: Female (Wales), male (France)
- Name day: 6 July

Origin
- Origin: from Welsh Gwen, the feminine form of Gwyn ("white, bright, fair, pure, blessed, holy")
- Meaning: "white, holy"
- Region of origin: Wales

Other names
- Related names: Gwenn (Breton); Gwenno, Gwenog (medieval diminutives); Gwyn (masculine equivalent)

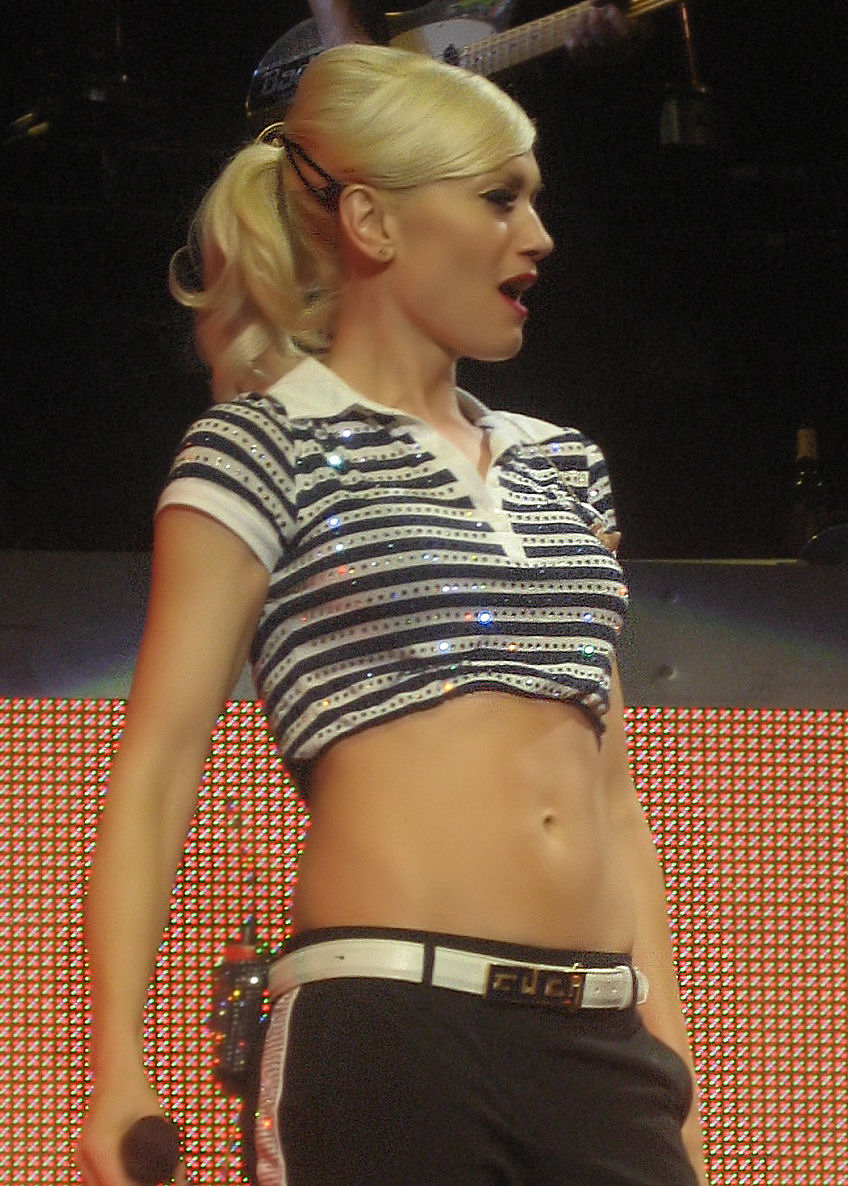
Gwen Stefani performing "Cool" at the Tweeter Center for the Performing Arts in Mansfield, Massachusetts, United States

Gwen is a Welsh feminine given name meaning "white, holy". It can also be a shortened form of Gwenhwyfar (Guinevere) or other names beginning with the same element, such as:

- Gwenhael, Gwenael, Gwenvael, Gwenaelle
- Gwenda (explained as a compound of gwen "white, pure, blessed, holy" + da "good, well")
- Gwendolen, Gwendoline, Gwendolyn
- Gweneira (from gwen "white" + eira "snow")
- Gwenfair (combination of gwen "blessed, holy" + -fair, soft mutation of Mair, "(the Virgin) Mary"
- Winefride (originally Gwenffrewi) (Breton: Gwenvred)
- Gwenfron (from gwen "white" + fron, mutated form of bron "breast"; cf. Bronwen)
- Gwenyth, Gwenith (identical to the Welsh word for "wheat")
- Gwenllian
- Gwennant (compound of gwen "white" + nant "stream, brook")
- Gwenola (modern feminized form of Breton Winwaloe)

Although superficially similar, Gwyneth has a different, albeit uncertain, etymological origin (likely either from Gwynedd or the Welsh gwynaeth, meaning joy, bliss or happiness).

== People ==
=== Pre-modern world ===
- Saint Wenna (died c. 492), also known as Gwen of Talgarth, medieval princess and Christian martyr
- Saint Wenna (queen), also known as Gwen ferch Cynyr, 5th century queen of Cornwall
- Gwen Teirbron, 5th or 6th century Breton Catholic and Russian Orthodox saint

=== Modern world ===
- Gwen Apuli (born 2003), stage name Gwen (singer), Filipino singer and member of the girl group Bini
- Gwen Benaway (born 1987), Canadian poet and activist
- Gwen Barlee (1963–2017), Canadian environmental activist
- Gwen Berry (born 1989), American hammer thrower
- Gwen Bristow (1903–1980), American author and journalist
- Gwen Carr (born 1949), American activist, public speaker, and author
- Gwen C. Clare (born 1945), American diplomat
- Gwen Davis (born 1936), American novelist
- Gwen Dickey (born 1953), American musician
- Gwen ferch Ellis (c. 1542–1594), the first recorded woman accused of witchcraft in Wales
- Gwen Farrar (1897–1944), English musician, actress and comedian
- Gwen Fleming (1916–2011), Australian doctor
- Gwen Frostic (1906–2001), American artist, entrepreneur, and author
- Gwen Gillen (1941–2017), American sculptor and artist
- Gwen Graham (born 1963), American lawyer and politician
- Gwen Guthrie (1950–1999), American singer
- Gwen Hall (1951–2006), American minister and activist
- Gwen Harwood (1920–1995), Australian poet
- Gwen Heeney (1952–2016), British sculptor
- Gwen Ifill (1955–2016), American journalist
- Gwen John (1876–1939), Welsh artist
- Gwen Jorgensen (born 1986), American world and Olympic champion triathlete
- Gwen Kelly (1922–2012), Australian novelist and short-story writer
- Gwen Knapp (1961–2023), American sports journalist
- Gwen Shamblin Lara (1955–2021), American founder of the Remnant Fellowship Cult and The Weigh Down Workshop
- Gwen Lee (1904–1961), American actress
- Gwen Margolis (1934–2020), American politician
- Gwen Marston (1936–2019), American quilter, teacher, lecturer, and author
- Gwen McCrae (born 1943), American singer
- Gwen Meredith (1907–2006), Australian writer, dramatist and playwright, and radio writer
- Gwen Moore (born 1951), American politician
- Gwen Nagel (1946–2009), New Zealand cricketer and international cricket umpire
- Gwen Ngwenya (born 1989), South African academic and politician
- Gwen O'Mahony (born 1972), Canadian politician
- Gwen Plumb (1912–2002), Australian performer
- Gwen van Poorten (born 1989), Dutch television presenter
- Gwen Ramokgopa, South African politician
- Gwen Raverat (1885–1957), English wood engraving artist
- Gwen Rix (1918−2000), New Zealand diver
- Gwen Richardson (1894–1944), Australian actress and travel writer
- Gwen Sebastian (born 1974), American country-rock singer
- Gwen Shamblin, American author
- Gwen Smith, Trinidadian cricketer of the 1990s
- Gwen Somerset (1894–1988), New Zealand educator
- Gwen Stefani (born 1969), American pop-rock, Ska and R&B singer
- Gwen Svekis (born 1996), American softball player
- Gwen Torrence (born 1965), American sprinter and Olympic champion
- Gwen Verdon (1925–2000), American dancer and actress
- Gwen Walz (born 1966), American civic leader and educator
- Gwen Watford (1927–1994), English actress

== Fictional characters ==
- Gwen Cooper, one of the main protagonists in the television series Torchwood
- Gwen Norbeck Munson, from the TV soap opera As the World Turns
- Gwen Poole, the protagonist of the Unbelievable Gwenpool comic book series
- Gwen Raiden, from the TV series Angel
- Gwen Rizczech, from the American soap opera Days of Our Lives
- Gwen Stacy, a character in Marvel Comics comic books and films
- Gwen Tennyson, from Cartoon Network's Ben 10 franchise
- Gwen Warren (Spider-Girl), a superhero and member of the X-Men
- Gwen Hotchkiss Winthrop, from the American soap opera Passions
- Gwen Wu, from the Nickelodeon animated TV series The Mighty B!
- Gwen (last name unknown), from the Canadian animated TV series Total Drama
