= Ann Trevor =

British actress (1899–1970)

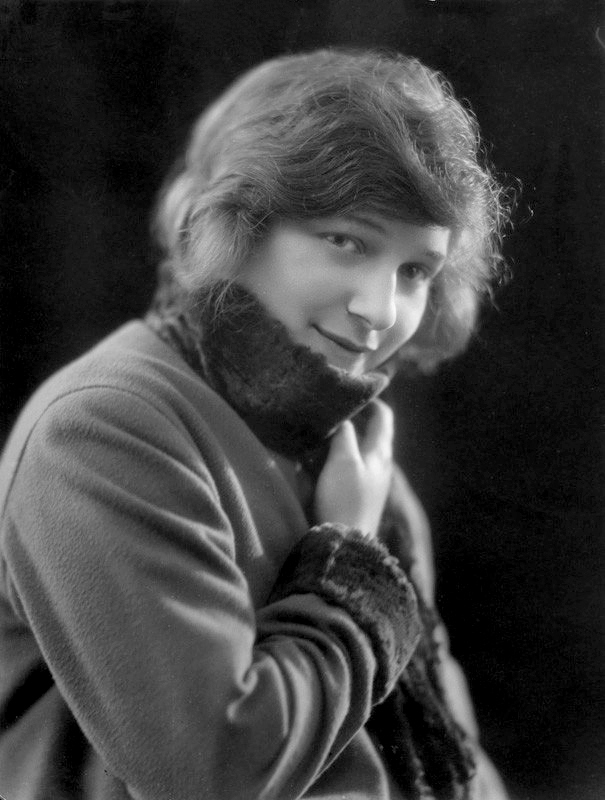
Trevor in 1922

Ann Trevor (1899–1970) was a British actress. Her stage work included the original production of Noël Coward's Hay Fever at London's Ambassadors Theatre, in 1925.

== Selected filmography ==
- Wuthering Heights (1920)
- Build Thy House (1920)
- The Headmaster (1921)
- Daniel Deronda (1921)
- A Tale of Two Cities (1922)
- A Rogue in Love (1922)
- Maria Marten, or The Murder in the Red Barn (1935)
