= Gwendal =

Gwendal is a given name.

== People with the given name ==
- Gwendal Marimoutou (born 1995), French actor
- Gwendal Peizerat (born 1972), French competitive ice dancer
- Gwendal Rouillard (born 1976), French politician

== See also ==
- Gwen
- Gwendalyn
