= Gwendolyn Black =

Canadian musician and social activist (1911–2005)

Gwendolyn McDonald Black (August 1, 1911 – February 28, 2005) was a Canadian musician, educator and community activist. She was the first woman from New Brunswick to become an Officer in the Order of Canada.

The daughter of Nathaniel McDonald, a Methodist pastor, and Statira Preble, she was born Gwendolyn McDonald in Medicine Hat, Alberta. Her father died when she was six and her mother found a job at Lasell Junior College for Girls in Auburndale, Massachusetts, where Black grew up. She became an American citizen as a result. In 1929, she returned to Canada, earning a BMus at Mount Allison's Ladies College in 1932. She returned to the College soon afterwards to teach music. After her marriage in 1935, she continued to give private piano lessons and to perform in recitals and competitions.

She married Joseph Laurence "Laurie" Black; they had four children.

She frequently played for the Sackville branch of the Canadian Association for the Mentally Challenged. From 1970 to 1973, she was national president of the Canadian Federation of University Women. She served on the boards of the VON, the Children's Aid Society, the Sackville Memorial Hospital and the New Brunswick Commission on Federal Constituencies. She was named to the Order of Canada in 1974. In 2003, she received the Charles Frederick Allison Award for her contributions to Mount Allison University.

She died in Sackville at the age of 93.
