= Winifreda =

Town in the province of La Pampa, Argentina

Coordinates: 36°15′S 64°14′W

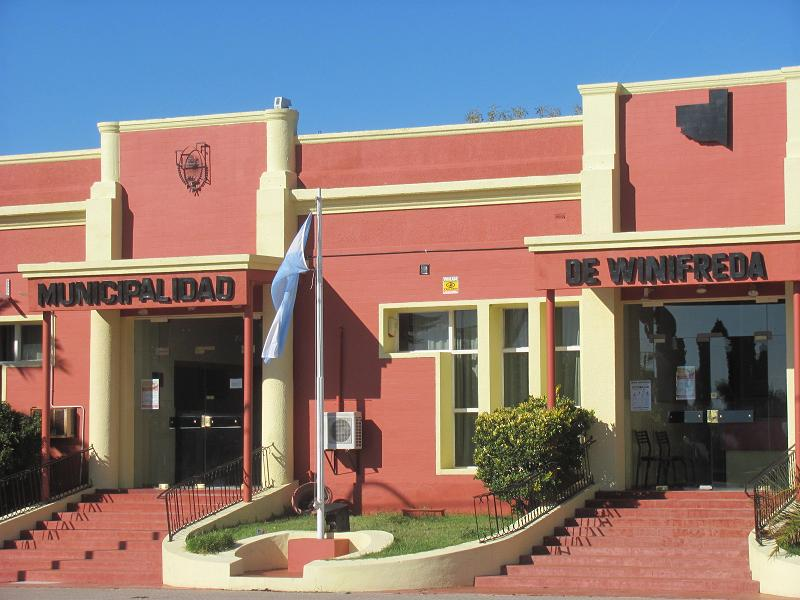
Winifreda

Winifreda is a town in the province of La Pampa, Argentina, 50 kilometres from Santa Rosa, in the department of Conhelo.

The town was founded on April 3, 1915 (tough some version set it on March 11, 1916), at the location of the railway station that was previously known as "Punta de Rieles" and "El Quemado". It is named in honor of Winifred Maud Drysdale Gibson (1899-1983), one of the daughters of Joseph Norman Drysdale, owner of the land where the town was founded.

It currently holds 2,124 inhabitants, plus 844 in the rural surrounding area.
