= Winifred =

Winifred is a feminine given name, an anglicization of Welsh Gwenffrewi. It may refer to:

== People ==
- Saint Winifred, 7th century Welsh saint
- Winifred Atwell (1914–1983), British pianist
- Winifred Mitchell Baker (born 1957), better known simply as Mitchell Baker, American CEO
- Winifred Benchley, better known as Wendy Benchley, American conservationist
- Winifred Brown (1899–1984) English sportswoman, aviator and author, first woman to win the King's Cup air race
- Winifred Brunton (1880–1959), South African painter
- Winifred Burks-Houck (1950–2004), American organic chemist
- Winifred Cameron (1918–2016), American astronomer
- Winifred Cavendish-Bentinck, Duchess of Portland (née Dallas-Yorke; 1863–1954), British humanitarian and animal welfare activist
- Winifred Copperwheat (1905–1976), English violist
- Winifred, Countess of Dundonald (1859–1924), Welsh countess and philanthropist
- Winifred Crossley Fair (1906–1984) British aviator, one of the First Eight women pilots to join the Air Transport Auxiliary.
- Winifred Darch (1884–1960), English children's writer
- Winifred Starr Dobyns (1886–1963), American suffragist and landscape designer
- Winifred Drinkwater (1913–1996) Scottish aviator and aeroplane engineer, first woman in the world to hold a commercial pilot's licence.
- Winifred Ewing (1929–2023), commonly known as Winnie Ewing, prominent Scottish National Party (SNP) politician
- Winifred Greenwood (1885–1961), American silent film actress
- Winifred Hackett (1906–1994) British electrical and aeronautical engineer who worked on guided weapon systems and the DEUCE computer
- Winifred G. Helmes (1913–2004), American academic
- Winifred Herbert (1680–1749), British aristocrat known for arranging the escape of her husband from the Tower of London
- Winifred Holtby (1898–1935), English novelist and journalist
- Winifred Jordan (1920–2019), English Olympic athlete
- Lady Winifred Kamit, Papua New Guinean lawyer
- Winifred Lamb (1894–1963), English archaeologist
- Winifred Langton (1909–2003), communist, internationalist and activist
- Winifred Lawson (1892–1961), English opera and concert singer
- Winifred Lewellin James (1876–1941), Australian writer
- Winifred Mary Letts (1882–1972), English writer, with strong Irish connections, known for her novels, plays and poetry
- Winifred W. Logan (1931–2010), British Nurse theorist who was co-author of the Roper-Logan-Tierney model of nursing
- Winifred Edgerton Merrill (1862–1951), the first American female to receive a PhD in mathematics
- Winifred Nicholson (1893–1981), British painter
- Winifred Reuning (1953–2015), American writer and editor
- Winifred Rushforth (1885–1983), Scottish medical practitioner and Christian missionary
- Winifred Spooner (1900–1933), English aviator
- Winifred, Lady Strickland (1645–1725), English courtier, member of the Jacobite court in exile
- Winifred Tanger (1922–2014), American politician
- Winifred Ann Taylor, Baroness Taylor of Bolton (born 1947), British politician
- Winifred Todhunter (1877–1961), British educator and founder of the Todhunter School for girls
- Winifred Tumim (1936–2009), English charity administrator
- Winifred "Freda" Utley (1898–1978), English scholar, political activist and best-selling author
- Winifred Wagner (1897–1980), head of the Wagner family from 1930 to 1945 and a close friend of German dictator Adolf Hitler
- Winifred Ward (1884–1975), American academic in the field of children's theatre
- Winifred Mary Ward (1884–1975), British speech therapist
- Winifred "Winnie" Mandela (1936–2018), South African anti-apartheid activist and the second wife of Nelson Mandela

== Music ==
- "Winifred", by Brymo from 9: Harmattan & Winter (2021)
- Winifred Ohili Adanu, Nigerian singer

== Places ==
- Winifred, Montana, a town in the United States
- Winnifred Beach, a beach in Jamaica

== Fictional characters ==
- Dora Winifred "D.W." Read, a character from the animated series Arthur
- Winifred Banks (Mrs. Banks), a character from Mary Poppins who appears as a suffragette in the 1964 Disney film and as a fashionable housewife in the Broadway musical
- Winifred Burkle, known as "Fred", a main character in the 1999 television series Angel
- Winifred "Winnie" Sanderson, the main antagonist in the 1993 film Hocus Pocus
- Winifred "Freddy" Greer, a character in "The Women Who Got Away," a 1995 New Yorker short story by John Updike
- Winifred "Winnie" Foster, a main character from the American book and movie Tuck Everlasting
- Winifred "Fred" Grant, a character voiced by Joey King in the Disney Channel animated series "Hamster and Gretel"
- Winifred Portley-Rind, "Winnie" in the film The Boxtrolls
- Major Benson Winifred Payne character played by Damon Wayans in the film “Major Payne”

== Ships ==
- SS Winifred (1901), a Uganda Railway Lake Victoria ferry scuttled in 1936
- USS Winifred, a United States Navy tanker and cargo ship in commission from 1918 to 1919

== See also ==
- Winifreda
- Winifrida
- Winnifred
- Winefreda
