= Gwendoline =

Gwendoline is a feminine given name, a variant of Gwendolen.

== Notable people called Gwendoline ==
- Gwendoline Maud Syrie Barnardo (1879–1955), a British interior decorator
- Gwendoline Butler (1922–2013), an English writer of mystery fiction
- Gwendoline Christie (born 1978), a British actress
- Gwendoline Davies (1882–1951), a Welsh patron of the arts
- Gwendoline Didier (born 1986), a French figure skater
- Gwendoline Eastlake-Smith (1883–1941), a British tennis player
- Gwendoline "Gwen" Harwood (1920–1995), an Australian poet
- Gwendoline Malegwale Ramokgopa, mayor of the City of Tshwane Metropolitan Municipality, South Africa
- Gwendoline Porter (1902–1993), a British athlete
- Gwendoline Riley (born 1979), an English writer
- Gwendoline "Wendy" Wood (1892–1981), a Scottish nationalist and artist
- Gwendoline Yeo (born 1977), a Singaporean-American actress and musician

=== Fictional characters ===
- Gwendoline Mary Lacey, a character in Enid Blyton's Malory Towers series of children's novels (1946–1951)

== See also ==
- Guendalina (disambiguation)
- Gwendolyn
- Wendeline (disambiguation)
