= Angharad =

Welsh feminine name

Angharad (/æŋˈhærəd/, ang-HARR-ad; or /æŋˈhæræd/; Welsh: [aˈŋ̊arad]) is a feminine given name in the Welsh language, having a long association with Welsh royalty, history and myth. It translates into English as much loved one. In Welsh mythology, Angharad Golden-Hand is the lover of Peredur in the myth cycle The Mabinogion.

== Variations ==
Other Welsh spellings of the name have been recorded, including Acgarat and Ancarat. There have been a number of variations of the name Angharad in medieval English, including Anchoretta, Ancret, Ancreta, Ancrett, Ankaret, Ankerita, Ingaretta, Ingaret, Anchoret, Ancoretta, Ancharita, Ancret, Ancarett, and Ankeret.

== Mythology & Fiction ==
The name Angharad appears in various mythological, folktale, and fictional works, including the medieval Welsh romance Peredur son of Efrawg, in which Angharad Golden-Hand is the lover of the knight Peredur.

== Historical figures ==
There have been a number of historical or semi-historical Angharads, most notably the daughter of Owain Gwynedd (1100–1170), King of Gwynedd, who married Gruffydd Maelor. Other historical Angharads include (ferch signifies 'daughter of'):

- Angharad ferch Meurig, wife of Rhodri the Great (820–878)
- Angharad ferch Llywelyn, daughter of Llywelyn the Great (1173–1240), Prince of Wales
- Angharad ferch Madog ap Gruffydd Maelor, sister to Gruffydd II ap Madog, Lord of Dinas Bran
- Angharad ferch Maredudd ab Owain, wife of Llywelyn ap Seisyll, King of Gwynedd and of Deheubarth
- Angharad ferch Rhys ap Gruffydd (1132–1197)
- Angharad ferch Gruffydd II ap Madog, Lord of Dinas Bran
- Angharad of Brittany, wife of Idwal Iwrch
- Angharad, daughter of Rhydderch Hael, a 6th-century king of Strathclyde
- Ankarette Twynho, a 15th-century lady-in-waiting to the Duchess of Clarence, falsely accused of the Duchess's murder

== People ==
- Angharad Evans (born 2003), British swimmer
- Angharad Gatehouse (born 1954), British entomologist
- Angharad James (poet) (1677–1749), Welsh poet
- Angharad James (footballer) (born 1994), Welsh football player
- Angharad Llwyd (1780–1866), Welsh historian
- Angharad Mair (born 1960), Welsh television presenter
- Angharad Mason (born 1979), Welsh cyclist
- Angharad Price (born 1972), Welsh academic and novelist
- Angharad Rees (1944–2012), Welsh actress
- Angharad Tomos (born 1958), Welsh author

== Fiction ==
- Angharad, mother of Princess Eilonwy in Lloyd Alexander's fictional land of Prydain
- Angharad, fictional character in The Rowan by Anne McCaffrey
- Angharad, fictional character in The Blue Sword by Robin McKinley
- Angharad, fictional character in Into the Green by Charles de Lint
- Angharad, fictional character in Juniper by Monica Furlong
- Angharad, fictional character in How Green Was My Valley by Richard Llewellyn
- Angharad, fictional character in the King Raven Trilogy, by Stephen R. Lawhead
- Angharad, fictional character in Monk's Hood by Ellis Peters
- The Splendid Angharad, fictional character in the film Mad Max: Fury Road, played by Rosie Huntington-Whiteley
- Angharrad, fictional horse in the young adult series Chaos Walking by Patrick Ness
- Angharad, sister of fictional character David in the book The Blue Rose by Kate Forsyth
- Angharad is Queen Guenièvre's lady's maid in the television series Kaamelott
- Angharad Scott, fictional character in the book Piranesi (novel) by Susanna Clarke
- Angharad, fictional character in A Study in Drowning by Ava Reid
- Angharad, offscreen fictional character in the film I am love by Luca Guadagnino
- Angharad, fictional village in Louisa M. Spooner's novel Country Landlords (1860)
