= World Fantasy Convention Award =

Special convention award for science fiction or fantasy achievements

- Awarded for: Peerless contributions to the fantasy genre
- Presented by: World Fantasy Convention
- First award: 1978
- Final award: 2013
- Most recent winner(s): William F. Nolan, Brian W. Aldiss
- Website: World Fantasy Award Winners

The World Fantasy Awards are given each year by the World Fantasy Convention for the best fantasy fiction published in English during the previous calendar year. The awards have been described by book critics such as The Guardian as a "prestigious fantasy prize", and one of the three most prestigious speculative fiction awards, along with the Hugo and Nebula Awards (which cover both fantasy and science fiction). The World Fantasy Convention Award is a special award given in some years for "peerless contributions to the fantasy genre". These have included authors, editors, and publishers. Other, annually-presented special awards are given out for professional or non-professional work in the prior year in the Special Award—Professional and Special Award—Non-professional categories. A Life Achievement award is also given annually. The World Fantasy Convention Award was first presented in 1978; it was awarded annually through 1987 and again in 1997 and 2013. It has not been awarded since, though it is still listed as an official category.

Most World Fantasy Award nominees and winners are decided by attendees and judges of the annual World Fantasy Convention. A ballot is posted in June for attendees of the current and previous two conferences to determine two of the finalists, and a panel of five judges adds three or more nominees before voting on the overall winner. The panel of judges is typically made up of fantasy authors and is chosen each year by the World Fantasy Awards Administration, which has the power to break ties. Unlike the other World Fantasy Award categories, the Convention Award has no nominees and is not decided in the usual way; instead, the winner is selected by the convention organizers themselves and announced along with the nominees in the other categories. The final results are presented at the World Fantasy Convention at the end of October. Through 2015, winners were presented with a statuette of H. P. Lovecraft; more recent winners receive a statuette of a tree.

Thirteen people and one publishing house have been given the Convention Award. Seven of the winners are primarily known for their writing, as opposed to editing work or artwork. Six of the winners have gone on to be awarded the Lifetime Achievement award, sometimes only a few years after they were given a Convention Award: Evangeline Walton four years later in 1989, Andre Norton eleven years later in 1998, Hugh B. Cave two years later in 1999, Donald M. Grant nineteen years later in 2003, and Stephen King and Gahan Wilson, twenty-four and twenty-three years later in 2004.

== Winners ==
In the following table, the years correspond to the date of the ceremony. Items in the Work(s) column are items and companies that the winner created or worked at; they are meant to be representative of the winner's career in the field of fantasy to that point, but the World Fantasy Convention Award is not given for any specific achievement, and no such achievements are listed by the World Fantasy Convention as reasons for the award. In some cases the winner is well known for their non-fantasy works, such as science fiction novels, which are not listed.

Winners and nominees
Year	Winner(s)	Work(s)	Ref.
1978	Glenn Lord	editing and publishing Robert E. Howard	
1979	Kirby McCauley	literary agent for Stephen King, chaired first World Fantasy Convention	
1980	Stephen King	The Dark Tower: The Gunslinger, The Stand	
1981	Gahan Wilson	Artwork for The Magazine of Fantasy & Science Fiction, The New Yorker	
1982	Roy Krenkel	Artwork for Weird Fantasy, Weird Science-Fantasy	
1982	Joseph Payne Brennan	Nine Horrors and a Dream, short fiction in Weird Tales	
1983	Arkham House	Fantasy and horror publisher	
1984	Donald M. Grant	Founder and publisher for Donald M. Grant, Publisher	
1985	Evangeline Walton	The Island of the Mighty, The Song of Rhiannon	
1986	Donald A. Wollheim	Editor at Ace Books, founder and editor at DAW Books	
1987	Andre Norton	Witch World, High Sorcery	
1997	Hugh B. Cave	Murgunstrumm and Others, Death Stalks the Night	
2013	Brian W. Aldiss	Frankenstein Unbound, Hothouse	
2013	William F. Nolan	Logan's Run, Ray Bradbury Review	
