= Mabinogion sheep problem =

Aspect of control theory

In probability theory, the Mabinogion sheep problem or Mabinogian urn is a problem in stochastic control introduced by David Williams (mathematician) in 1991, who named it after a herd of magic sheep in the Welsh collection of tales, the Mabinogion.

== Statement ==
And he came towards a valley, through which ran a river; and the borders of the valley were wooded, and on each side of the river were level meadows. And on one side of the river he saw a flock of white sheep, and on the other a flock of black sheep. And whenever one of the white sheep bleated, one of the black sheep would cross over and become white; and when one of the black sheep bleated, one of the white sheep would cross over and become black

— Peredur the son of Evrawk, from the Mabinogion, translated by Lady Charlotte Guest (1812–1895)

At time t = 0 there is a herd of sheep each of which is black or white. At each time t = 1, 2, ... a sheep is selected at random, and a sheep of the opposite color (if one exists) is changed to be the same color as the selected sheep. At any time one may remove as many sheep (of either color) as one wishes from the flock. The problem is to do this in such a way as to maximize the expected final number of black sheep.

The optimal solution at each step is to remove just enough white sheep so that there are more black sheep than white sheep.

== Sources ==
- Chan, Terence (1996), "Some diffusion models for the Mabinogion sheep problem of Williams", Advances in Applied Probability, 28 (3): 763–783, doi:10.2307/1428180, MR 1404309
- Williams, David (1991), Probability with martingales, Cambridge Mathematical Textbooks, Cambridge University Press
