= The Sword Is Forged =

1983 novel by Evangeline Walton

- First edition cover
- Author: Evangeline Walton
- Cover artist: Rowena Morrill
- Language: English
- Genre: Historical fiction
- Publisher: Timescape Books
- Publication date: 1983
- Publication place: United States
- Media type: Print (hardcover & paperback)
- Pages: 347
- ISBN: 0-671-46490-6

The Sword Is Forged is a 1983 historical fiction novel by Evangeline Walton. It is based on the story of Theseus and the Amazon queen Antiope from Greek mythology.

== Plot ==
The Amazon queen Antiope is captured by Theseus and brought back to Athens to become his bride. They fall in love and she bears him a son, Hippolytus, but soon the Amazons besiege Athens to reclaim their queen.

== Characters ==
- Antiope, young queen of the Amazons
- Theseus, king of Athens
- Molpadia, Amazon War Queen and Antiope's aunt
- Herakles, Greek hero

== Development and publication ==
According to Douglas A. Anderson, Walton wrote a trilogy of novels about Theseus in the mid-1940s. She completely rewrote all three books in the mid-1950s, but put them aside when Mary Renault published her own Theseus novels, The King Must Die (1958) and later The Bull from the Sea (1962). After the success of the Ballantine editions of her Mabinogion tetralogy in the 1970s, Walton visited Greece and started reworking her own Theseus trilogy. The first volume was published as The Sword Is Forged in 1983. Walton died in 1996, and the other two installments remain unpublished.

== Themes ==
In The Encyclopedia of Fantasy, John Clute and John Grant cite The Sword Is Forged as an example of the use of the Amazon in sword and sorcery as "an icon of female autonomy". They go on to explain that novel uses Theseus to present "a patriarchal challenge to the Amazon in terms which allow some inspired debate". Kirkus Reviews suggests that the takeaway theme of the novel is that "love 'must always mean bondage' for women".

== Reception ==
Kirkus Reviews called The Sword Is Forged "an earnest, hard-working, but spindly reconstruction" of the Theseus myth, noting that "Antiope has a certain pep in the first half here ... But the Amazons emerge as a kind of terrorist branch of NOW, and Antiope's decline into All-for-Love milque-toastery is truly tedious." Don D'Ammassa wrote in his Encyclopedia of Fantasy and Horror Fiction that the novel is "an entertaining story but fails to measure up to [Walton's] Welsh stories".

Mary Renault described The Sword Is Forged as "a keen exploration of Greek myth", and Poul Anderson wrote that Walton's "scholarship and realistic detail never get in the way of an exciting and moving story." Praising Walton's combination of feminism and romantic love, Fritz Leiber called the novel "the best fictional depiction of the Amazons that I've ever encountered".

The novel was nominated for a 1984 Locus Award, but lost to The Mists of Avalon by Marion Zimmer Bradley. Bradley had previously called Walton's novel "a book of wonderful humanity and great classic force."
