= Witch House =

1945 novel by Evangeline Walton

- Dust-jacket illustration by Ronald Clyne.
- Author: Evangeline Walton
- Cover artist: Ronald Clyne
- Language: English
- Genre: Fantasy, horror
- Publisher: Arkham House
- Publication date: 1945
- Publication place: United States
- Media type: Print (hardback)
- Pages: 200

Witch House is a fantasy novel by American writer Evangeline Walton. It was published in 1945 by Arkham House in an edition of 3,000 copies. It was the first full-length novel to be published by Arkham House and was listed as the initial book in the Library of Arkham House Novels of Fantasy and Terror. An expanded version, with a newly written 20,000-word prologue, was published in England in 1950. In 2013, Centipede Press issued the first American edition of this revised version, also including previously unpublished writings by Walton and several of her short stories.

According to Robert Weinberg, the volume was Arkham House's greatest flop - an excellent novel that took nearly two decades to go out of print.

E. F. Bleiler described the novel as a "Neo-Gothic thriller... [marked by] imaginative writing, a good climax, but a prolonged, dull first section and characterizations that do not click." The Encyclopedia of Fantasy found it to be "an atmospheric Haunted-Dwelling tale".

== Sources ==
- Jaffery, Sheldon (1989). The Arkham House Companion. Mercer Island, WA: Starmont House. p. 12. ISBN 1-55742-005-X.
- Chalker, Jack L.; Owings, Mark (1998). The Science-Fantasy Publishers: A bibliographic history, 1923-1998. Westminster, MD, and Baltimore, MD: Mirage Press. p. 28.
- Joshi, S.T. (1999). Sixty Years of Arkham House: A history and bibliography. Sauk City, WI: Arkham House. p. 31. ISBN 0-87054-176-5.
- Nielsen, Leon (2004). Arkham House Books: A collector's guide. Jefferson, NC, and London, UK: McFarland & Company. p. 55. ISBN 0-7864-1785-4.
