= Angharad Golden-Hand =

Fictional Welsh heroine

Angharad Golden-Hand (/æŋˈhærəd/ ang-HARR-əd, Welsh: [aˈŋ̊arad]; otherwise Angharat or Angharad Law Eurawc) is the heroine of the Welsh Romance Peredur son of Efrawg, and associated with the Mabinogion.

In the Welsh tale of Peredur, Angharad Golden-Hand is a lady of King Arthur's court. The tale relates how the eponymous hero, having fallen in love with Angharad, vows not to speak to any Christian man until she declares her love in return. This earns Peredur the title "The Mute Knight". Eventually, Angharad witnesses Peredur defeat a strong knight in a joust. Though she does not know his identity, she is impressed, and declares she loves the Mute Knight for his prowess in the field. Her declaration allows Peredur to speak once more, and he reveals his true identity. At that point, however, the narrative switches to his companionship with Arthur's men, and his relationship with Angharad receives no further focus or development.

In Thomas Hughes's play The Misfortunes of Arthur, Angharad is depicted as Queen Guinevere's sister. Angharad dissuades Guinevere from suicide, which the Queen is contemplating after learning Arthur is returning to Britain to fight the treacherous Mordred.

A character named Angharad Goldenhand appears in Alan Garner's novels The Weirdstone of Brisingamen and The Moon of Gomrath, but Garner's Angharad is an aspect of the triple moon goddess, rather than the mortal woman of "Peredur". Garner claimed to have used the name in the belief that it derived from a lost Welsh tradition or story.

Angharad Golden-Hand is thought to be the subject of a lady's cameo image featured on the corner elevation of the former Clarence Hotel in Pontypridd, Wales. The building is now a nightclub and bingo hall.
