= Angharad Gatehouse =

British entomologist

- Scientific career
- Institutions: Newcastle University

Angharad M. R. Gatehouse is an entomologist in the UK. Gatehouse is Professor of Invertebrate Molecular Biology at Newcastle University, is on the Council of the International Congress of Entomology, and is the Director of Expertise for BioEconomy.

== Research ==
Gatehouse's research examines plant and pest insect interactions at the molecular level, and how this can be used for integrated pest management.

She has researched compounds for novel biopesticides which may have less or no impact on non target organisms such as pollinators and predators. Her team tested the Hv1a/GNA fusion protein as a potential biopesticide, the compound combines a venom toxin of an Australian funnel web spider and snowdrop lectin and they found it did not have detrimental effects on honeybees.

Her work has looked at how plants interact with insects and how this can be manipulated to reduce the attraction of crop plants to insect pests. She tested gene edited rice plants which suppress the production of serotonin with an inactivated CYP71A1 gene, the plants were more resistant to the brown plant-hopper and the striped stem borer.

Her team identified that the compound limonene makes Marigold plants good companion plants with tomatoes in enclosed glasshouse conditions, as they repel the insect pest the glasshouse whitefly.

== Books ==
- Environmental Impact of Genetically Modified Crops, edited with Natalie Ferry, published by CABI in 2009.

== Honours and awards ==
- Awarded the Certificate of Distinction by the International Congress of Entomology in 2016, the 'world's top honour for entomology'.
- Fellow of the Royal Society of Biology in 2016.
