= Peredur son of Efrawg =

One of the Three Welsh Romances

Peredur fab Efrawg
- "Peredur son of Efrawg"
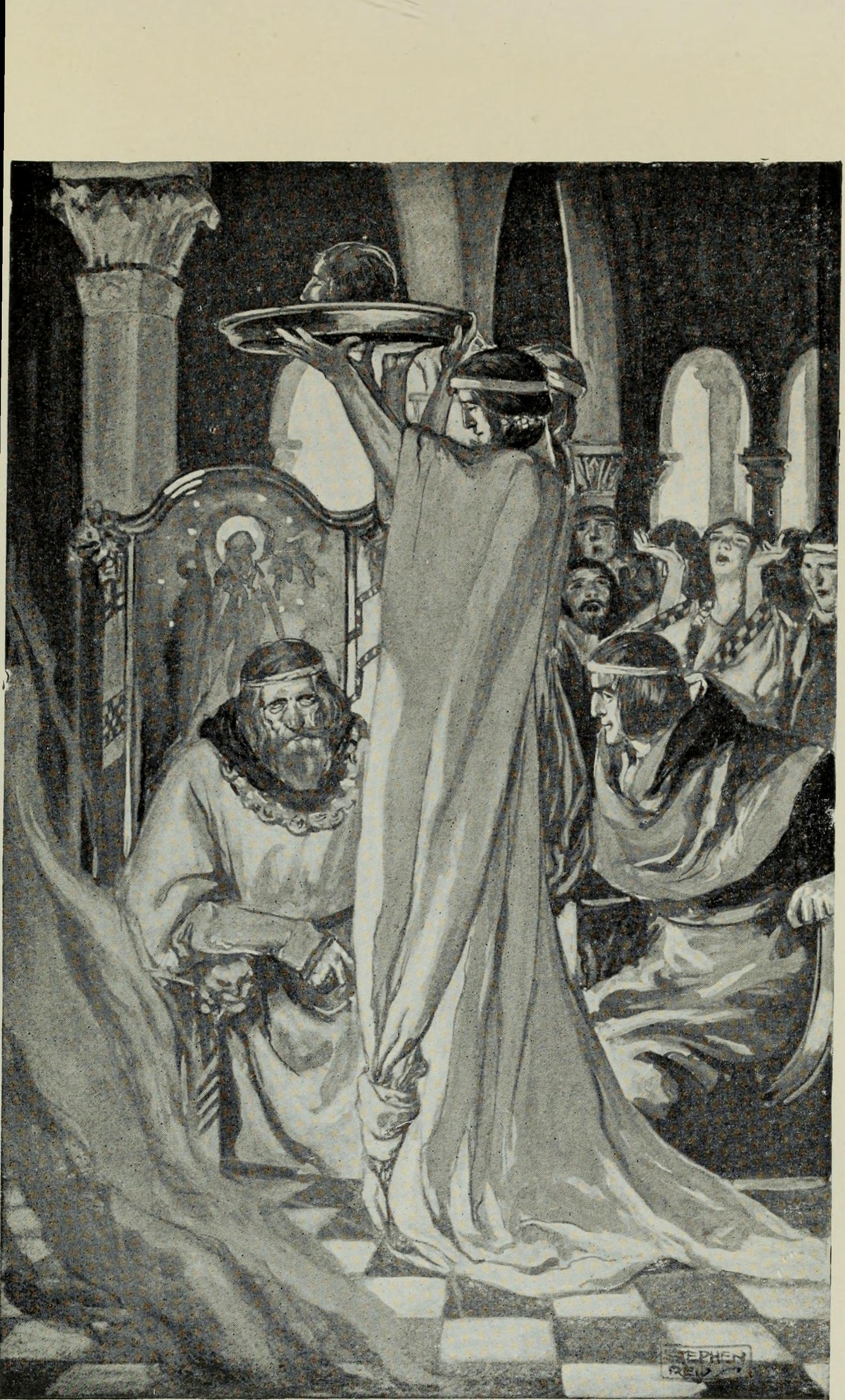
- The mysterious severed head being shown to Peredur by the King in T. W. Rolleston's Myths and Legends of the Celtic Race (1910)
- Also known as: Historia Peredur ab Efrawg
- Author(s): Anonymous author
- Language: Middle Welsh
- Date: 12th or 13th century
- Manuscript(s): White Book of Rhydderch, MS Peniarth 7, MS Peniarth 14 and the Red Book of Hergest
- Genre: Prose, Three Welsh Romances of the Mabinogion
- Personages: Peredur son of Effrawg, King Arthur, Gwalchmai, Owain, Cei, Nine Sorceresses, Angharad

Peredur son of Efrawg is one of the Three Welsh Romances associated with the Mabinogion. It tells a story roughly analogous to Chrétien de Troyes' unfinished romance Perceval, the Story of the Grail, but it contains many striking differences from that work, most notably the absence of the French poem's central object, the grail.

== Synopsis ==
The central character of the tale is Peredur, son of Efrawg (York). As in Chrétien's Perceval, the hero's father dies when he is young, and his mother takes him into the woods and raises him in isolation.

Eventually, he meets a group of knights and determines to become like them, so he travels to the court of King Arthur. There he is ridiculed by Cei and sets out on further adventures, promising to avenge Cei's insults to himself and those who defended him. While travelling, he meets two of his uncles. The first (playing the role of Percival's Gornemant) educates him in arms and warns him not to ask the significance of what he sees. The second (replacing Chrétien's Fisher King) reveals a salver containing a man's severed head. The young knight does not ask about this and proceeds to further adventure, including a stay with the Nine Witches of Gloucester (Caer Loyw) and the encounter with the woman who was to be his true love, Angharad Golden-Hand.

Peredur returns to Arthur's court, but soon embarks on another series of adventures that do not correspond to material in Percival (Gawain's exploits take up this section of the French work). In the end, the hero learns the severed head at his uncle's court belonged to his cousin, who had been killed by the Nine Witches. Peredur avenges his family by helping Arthur and others destroy the Witches, and is celebrated as a hero.

== Manuscripts and dating ==
Versions of the text survive in four manuscripts from the 14th century: (1) the mid-14th century White Book of Rhydderch or Aberystwyth, NLW, MS Peniarth 4; (2) MS Peniarth 7, which dates from the beginning of the century, or earlier, and lacks the beginning of the text; (3) MS Peniarth 14, a fragment from the 2nd quarter of the 14th century, and (4) the Red Book of Hergest, from the end of the same century. The texts found in the White Book of Rhydderch and Red Book of Hergest represent the longest version. They are generally in close agreement and most of their differences are concentrated in the first part of the text, before the love-story of Angharad.

MS Peniarth 7, the earliest manuscript, concludes with Peredur's the hero's 14-year stay in Constantinople, reigning with the Empress. This has been taken to indicate that the adventures in the Fortress of Marvels, which follow this episode in the longest version, represent a later addition to the text.

On orthographic grounds, Glenys Goetinck postulates a date in the 12th century. Many other scholars, however, have favoured a later date.

== Sources and analogues ==
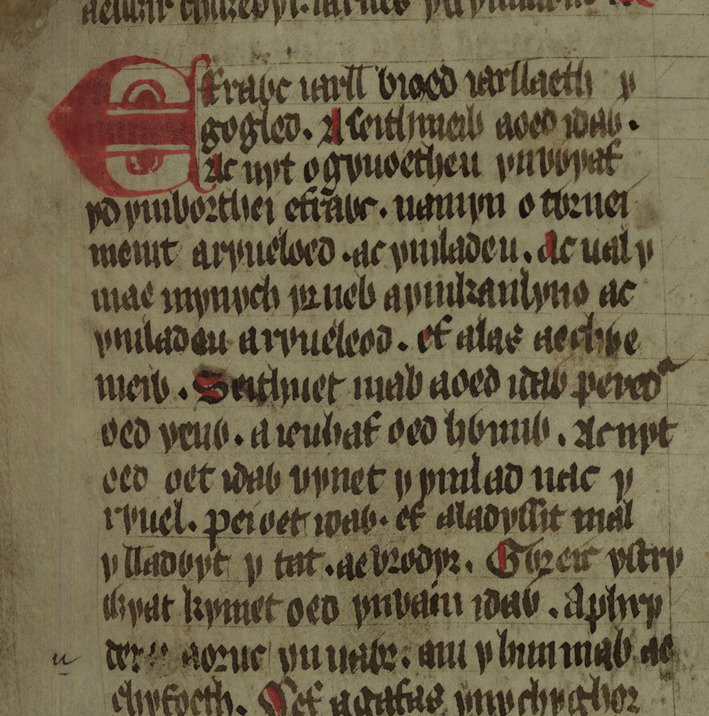
The opening lines of Peredur on Jesus College, Oxford (MS 111)

Like the other Welsh Romances, scholars debate as to the work's exact relationship to Chrétien's poem. It is possible Peredur preserves some of the material found in Chrétien's source. The sequence of some events are altered in Peredur, and many original episodes appear, including the reign in Constantinople, which contains remnants of a sovereignty tale. The grail (Old French graal) is replaced with a severed head on a platter, reflecting stories of Bran the Blessed from the Mabinogion. Despite these seemingly-traditional elements, however, influence from the French romance cannot be discounted. As John Carey notes, there are significant phrase-for-phrase parallels between Chretien's poem and Peredur, especially in the conversation between Gawain/Gwalchmai and Perceval/Peredur that occurs after Gawain/Gwalchmai covers the blood on the snow which reminds Perceval/Peredur of his love (Blancheflor in Chretien). Moreover, the black-haired hag describes the bleeding spear Peredur saw earlier in the tale as a small spear carried by one youth with a single drop running down (like Chretien), but this is different from how the relevant earlier passage in Peredur depicts it, which is as a gigantic spear carried by two youths and bleeding three drops.

The hero of the poem has a father, Efrawg, whose name has been etymologically associated with York (the modern Welsh name for York is Efrog or Caerefrog, derived from the Roman Eboracum via the Brythonic Caer Ebrauc mentioned by Nennius). Thus, it can be speculated that Peredur may have been based on a Brythonic prince who ruled in that area. He appears in multiple medieval Welsh sources as the son of Eliffer Gosgorddfawr (Eliffer Lord of Hosts), along with his brother Gwrgi and fought in the battle of Arfedrydd against Gwenddolau ap Ceidio. "Myrddin" (Merlin) is also associated with them in that battle as going mad following it. However Carey himself connects the Peredur of this romance, and Perceval by proxy, with the otherworldly Mabinogion character Pryderi, as other scholars have done. Of course, it is hardly necessary to find a source for every detail of the narrative: the narrator whose text we have may have freely indulged in original creativity. A parallel case with traditional stories in Ireland is found in the examples given in J.E. Caerwyn-Williams, Y Storïwr Gwyddeleg a'i Chwedlau (University of Wales Press), where Caerwyn-Williams freely admits that the form of the story given by the storyteller depends on the audience to which it is delivered. It is not necessary therefore always to find literary sources for such tales in their Middle Welsh form: in any case, most written sources will have perished, and there is no way that we can tell if the surviving sources are in any way representative of the whole of what might have been extant.

== Sources ==
- Carey, John (2007). Ireland and the Grail. Aberystwyth: Celtic Studies Publications 11.
- Gantz, Jeffrey (trans.), The Mabinogion, Penguin, 1987. ISBN 0-14-044322-3
- Lovecy, Ian. "Historia Peredur ab Efrawg." In The Arthur of the Welsh: the Arthurian legend in medieval Welsh literature, edited by Rachel Bromwich, A.O.H. Jarman and B.F. Roberts. Cardiff, 1991. 171–82.
- Vitt, Anthony M. (ed. and trans.), Peredur vab Efrawc: Edited Texts and Translations of the MSS Peniarth 7 and 14 Versions, https://pure.aber.ac.uk/portal/files/11363276/Vitt_Electronic_MPhil_Thesis.pdf. MPhil thesis, Aberystwyth University, 2011. 203–204.
