= The Half-Made World =

2010 novel by Felix Gilman

- Author: Felix Gilman
- Cover artist: Ross MacDonald and Jamie Stafford-Hill
- Language: English
- Series: None
- Genre: Steampunk fantasy
- Publisher: Tom Doherty Associates
- Publication date: October 12, 2010
- Publication place: United Kingdom
- Media type: Print (Paperback)
- Pages: 480
- ISBN: 0-7653-2552-7

The Half-Made World is a 2010 steampunk fantasy novel by British writer Felix Gilman. It is set in an alternate version of the American Wild West in which the Far West reaches of the world are untamed and still being created. It tells the story of Liv Alverhuysen, a female psychologist who sets off on an adventure to heal the mad John Creedmoor, an Agent of the Gun who is goaded into obedience to his master's orders, despite his growing disdain for them. The novel pits two rival factions against each other as they each hunt for a way to end the everlasting war between them. The Line is industrial, with technological weapons and trains that speed by so quickly the countryside is barely seen and take over towns and make their citizens slaves at their whim. The Gun are made up of thieves and murderers and keep hold of the people by fear and violence, but they are losing the war against the Line. The book was nominated for a 2011 Locus Award.

== Prologue ==
The book begins by telling the story of how the General falls prey to one of the Line's noisemaker devises, something that drives the listener mad if it does not kill them outright. As he lies immobile on the ground, Linesmen walk among the dead and wounded, slaying any still alive. One lazy Lineman leaves the General alive because he does not want to spare the effort to bend over to slit his throat.

== Plot summary ==
The reader is introduced to the character of Dr. Lysvet 'Liv' Alverhuysen at the Koenigswald Academy, where she has taught for years. A letter has come for her dead husband, a plea to come west to the edge of the world and the House of Dolorous, a hospital who takes in all wounded, regardless of which side of the war they were injured on. She begins her difficult journey with the help of the school janitor, a brain damaged but extremely large man who wants nothing more than to protect her.

John Creedmore is relaxing on a ferryboat, enjoying being out of the war, when his masters, the Gun, summon him to take on a new mission. He is to go to the House of Dolorous and retrieve (but not kill) an old man believed to have secrets of a great weapon from the First Folk, wild people who live in the hills, that can kill the Line engines, which are the alternate version of the Gun.

Down the Line, Lowry is tasked with the same mission. He goes about it in the opposite way from Creedmoor, as an army is essentially brought in to support him.

Creedmoor, having continued to ride through the death of several horses, reaching the town of Kloan and decides he needs a break, contrary to his master's wishes. They reluctantly concede and he wanders through the town looking for entertainment. Instead, soldiers of the Line recognize him and the town is turned into an all-out battleground as Creedmoor escapes. Lowry and his support men flood the town hours afterward, but they are too late. Instead, they set up an outpost and prepare to wait until Creedmoor attempts to leave with the General.

Creedmoor tricks his way into the House of Dolorous because his usual method of killing is impossible in the House, which is protected by a guardian who will kill anyone who kills. Liv arrives at the same time, after a difficult journey. She unwittingly picks the General as one of her two psychology subjects to study and attempt to cure, and when Creedmore springs his trap, distracting the guardian with the pain and suffering of all the patients at once, she is carried along with the General as they head west, the only place where they can escape the Line. The soldiers of the Line follow, but the going is much rougher for them in the wild west, because they are dependent upon their technology which has not yet stretched this far. Afraid of any type of failure, Lowry presses on as his soldiers dwindle.

Liv and the General are discovered by what is left of the Red Valley Republic, who had moved as far west as they could years ago with their General's defeat. They call their town New Design. Creedmore has gone off to try to slay a dragon-like creature for the thrill of the hunt. His masters' voices come and go now and he sometimes thinks disloyal thoughts about them, which they note upon their return. They threaten to harm him, but he laughs it off, knowing he is the only one they have out here with the General. Liv and the General are made welcome in the New Design, but Liv cannot shake off how ill-prepared the town is, even as she warns them the Line is coming.

The Line comes. The town fights, but falters until Creedmoor decides to throw in his hand and save most of them. During the mop up, he takes the General and Liv follows. The six remaining men of the Line follow. Liv senses that Creedmoor's masters will not allow him to act in his own accord, and when she gets her chance, she stabs him repeatedly with her knife, even as he heals. She causes enough damage that the Linesmen catch up to a broken Creedmoor and are able to subdue him, and they blow up his Gun, which has tied him to his masters for so many years. Once the Gun is destroyed, Liv steps forward and kills the two remaining Linesmen. The General had been shot when Liv first attacked Creedmoor, and he tells them his dying story of where he had been going to find the weapon.

Creedmoor is still tied up, but Liv cannot decide if she will free him or let him die for his crimes committed at whim of the Gun. She eventually frees him.

== Epilogue ==
The Engines believe that Lowry has failed and are afraid of what will come out of the west. A tracker and Agent of the Gun named Knoll is sent after Creedmoor, whom the Gun know has not died. New Design starts to be rebuilt as New New Design. The academy holds a funeral for Liv upon receiving a letter from the House about her kidnapping and presumed death.

== Characters ==
- Liv Alverhuysen: A psychologist who goes to help mental patients at the House of Dolorous, but ends up being kidnapped by Creedmoor and dragged along west for the ride.
- John Creedmoor: An agent of the Gun who is forced into service by his masters who give him additional strength and healing powers. He kills easily but likes to provoke his masters by leaving people alive; in this way, he spares Liv's life.
- General Enver (the General): Once the leader of the Red Valley Republic forces, he is now an insane man who spouts fairy tales as his only words. But in his youth, he befriended a First Folk, who was to give him a great secret to end the war. Throughout the novel, he is pursued for this knowledge.
- Kan-Kuk: A First-Folk, and the General's ally. He promises the General a weapon that will bring peace.
- Maggfrid: The giant but dull-witted janitor at Koenigswald Academy who Liv takes with her on her journey for protection.
- Lowry: The Linesman who is tasked with retrieving the General and gleaning any information he might still possess on the great weapon that will end the war.

== Critical reception ==
Publishers Weekly said of The Half-Made World that "the lyrical descriptions of the harsh, dramatic, and mystical frontier compel the reader onward.". Eric Van Lustbader calls it "the love child of McCarthy’s The Road and Le Guin’s The Dispossessed." Ursula K. Le Guin says the novel has "“Vivid and accurate prose, a gripping, imaginative story, a terrifically inventive setting, a hard-bitten, indestructible hero, and an intelligent, fully adult heroine.".

== Sequel ==
The author published a sequel, The Rise of Ransom City. The book is not a direct sequel, as it is focused primarily on the character Harry Ransom, not the original protagonists of The Half-Made World, but it is set in the same universe and takes place after it, with a number of characters appearing in both books.
