= Felix Gilman =

British writer

- Felix Gilman gives a reading at the 2010 Brooklyn Indie Mart Steampunk Show
- Born: Felix John Gilman; 11 November 1974; London, England
- Occupations: Attorney, author
- Writing career
- Language: English
- Genres: Science fiction, Steampunk, Fantasy
- Notable works: Thunderer, The Half-Made World

Felix John Gilman (born 11 November 1974 in London) is a British writer of fantasy and weird fiction. His 2007 novel Thunderer (published by Bantam Spectra) was nominated for the 2009 Locus Award for Best First Novel, and earned him a nomination for the John W. Campbell Award for Best New Writer in both 2009 and 2010.

== Personal life ==
Gilman lives in New York City, where he practices law.

== Bibliography ==
=== Novels ===
- Thunderer. Spectra. 2007. ISBN 978-0-553-80676-2.
- Gears of the City. Spectra. 2008. ISBN 978-0-553-80677-9.
- The Half-Made World. Tor. 2010. ISBN 978-0-7653-2552-5.
- The Rise of Ransom City. Tor. 2012. ASIN B008E8NO76.
- The Revolutions. Tor Books. 2014. ISBN 9780765337177.
