= Evangeline Walton =

American novelist

Evangeline Walton Ensley
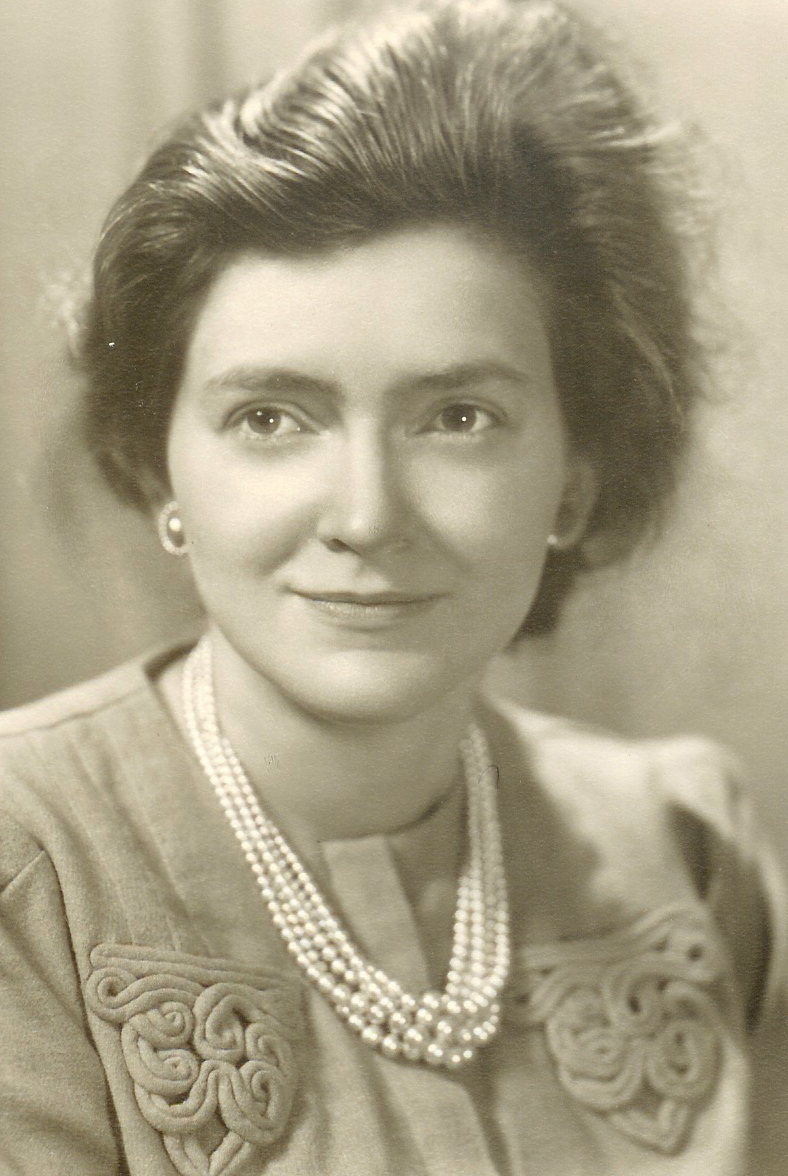
- Born: November 24, 1907; Indianapolis, Indiana
- Died: March 11, 1996 (aged 88); Tucson, Arizona
- Occupation: Author
- Writing career
- Pen name: Evangeline Walton
- Genre: Fantasy
- Notable works: The Mabinogion tetralogy; The Cross and the Sword; Witch House; The Sword Is Forged

Evangeline Walton (24 November 1907 – 11 March 1996) was the pen name of Evangeline Wilna Ensley, an American writer of fantasy fiction. She remains popular in North America and Europe because of her “ability to humanize historical and mythological subjects with eloquence, humor and compassion”.

== Life ==
Born in Indianapolis, Indiana to Marion Edmund Ensley and Wilna Eunice Ensley née Coyner, Walton came from a lively, educated, Quaker family. Walton suffered chronic respiratory illnesses as a child, and was privately or self-taught at home. Her parents separated and divorced in 1924. Growing up and living with her mother and her grandmother and witnessing her parents’ marital difficulties roused a natural feminism in Walton which appears throughout her writings. As a child, Walton enjoyed the works of L. Frank Baum, James Stephens, Lord Dunsany and Algernon Blackwood, which she would later cite as influences on her fiction. Walton and her mother traveled often to New York City, Chicago and San Francisco for opera, especially for Richard Wagner’s Der Ring des Nibelungen; opera was a passion her entire life. In 1946 after the death of her grandmother, Walton and her mother moved to Tucson, Arizona. Wilna Ensley died in 1971 but not before she saw the dawn of public recognition for Walton and her works.

Most of Walton’s published and unpublished works were originally written in the 1920s through the early 1950s. She worked on her best known work, the Mabinogion tetralogy, during the late 1930s and early 1940s, and her Theseus trilogy during the late 1940s. Once success found her after 1970, she reworked many of her manuscripts for publication over the next twenty years. Walton said of her knack for writing fantasy: “My own method has always been to try to put flesh and blood on the bones of the original myth; I almost never contradict sources, I only add and interpret.” In 1991, she underwent surgery for a brain tumor that proved benign. However, her health continued to decline.

Treated as a child with silver nitrate tincture for frequent bronchitis and severe sinus infections, Walton, who had extremely fair skin, absorbed the pigment of the tincture, causing her skin to turn blue-gray and darken as she aged.

Walton corresponded with the British novelist, essayist and poet John Cowper Powys for many years. Some of Walton's papers from 1936 to 1984—including biographic material, manuscripts and the correspondence with Powys—are archived in Special Collections at the Library, University of Arizona in Tucson. She was first cousin to Clifford C. Furnas (1900–1969), author of The Next Hundred Years, Assistant Secretary of War in the Eisenhower administration, co-founder of NASA and chancellor of SUNY Buffalo; and to Clifton J. Furness (1898–1946), professor of music and author of The Genteel Female: An Anthology (1931). Furness edited and introduced a facsimile edition of Leaves of Grass (1939) and Walt Whitman's Workshop: A Collection of Unpublished Manuscripts (1928). A writer himself, Furness encouraged, inspired and mentored his young cousin Evangeline.

Walton herself wrote about her chosen pen name, "I use the name Walton professionally, partly because I originally hoped to build up different lines of work under different names, partly because Walton is an old family name and appears on the Declaration of Independence. Not that I can trace any blood connection between my Quaker Waltons and the Declaration signer. They came from Virginia, and were supposed to have had a [Native American] man somewhere up the family tree. He may be the reason why both records and tradition trail off into vagueness. But when I was a child, old folk remembered the Waltons as very tall, very dark people, too full of restless energy to fit quietly into their peaceful little Quaker community: a vivid, turbulent note in it."

== Writings ==
Evangeline Walton with her first edition, 1936

Walton is best known for her four novels retelling the Welsh Mabinogi. She published her first volume in 1936 under the publisher's title of The Virgin and the Swine. Although receiving warm praise from John Cowper Powys, the book sold poorly and none of the other novels in the series reached print at the time. It was rediscovered by Ballantine's Adult Fantasy series in 1970, and reissued as The Island of the Mighty.

Editors at Ballantine were unaware that she was still alive, till she got in touch and sent them a second novel that had been left unfinished when the first failed to sell. This appeared as The Children of Llyr (1971). It was followed by The Song of Rhiannon (1972) and Prince of Annwn (1974). All four novels were published in a single volume as The Mabinogion Tetralogy (2002) by Overlook Press. The four novels are translated and available in several European languages. The rights to Walton’s Mabinogi work were purchased by Stevie Nicks in the hopes of bringing the epic to the big screen.

Walton's Witch House was written in the mid- to late-1930s and published in 1945 as the first volume in “The Library of Arkham House Novels of Fantasy and Terror”. It is an occult horror story set in New England. In 1956, she published The Cross and the Sword, a historical novel set during the Danish conquest of England and the destruction of its Celtic culture.

In 1983, Walton published The Sword Is Forged, the first of a planned Theseus trilogy. Walton had completed the trilogy in the late 1940s but the publication by Mary Renault of her Theseus novels in 1958 and 1962 kept Walton from publishing her own. The remaining two novels in the trilogy remain unpublished.

Walton published several short stories. The best-known of these are “Above Ker-Is” (1980), “The Judgement of St. Yves” (1981) and “The Mistress of Kaer-Mor” (1980). She also wrote seven unpublished novels, several volumes of unpublished short stories, poems, and a verse play. Some of these works have been published posthumously: See bibliography below.

Douglas A. Anderson is the agent for Walton's literary works.

== Awards ==
- Mythopoeic Fantasy Award for Adult Literature, Best Novel nominee, 1972: The Children of Llyr.
- Mythopoeic Fantasy Award for Adult Literature, Best Novel winner, 1973: The Song of Rhiannon.
- Mythopoeic Fantasy Award for Adult Literature, Best Novel nominee, 1975: Prince of Annwn.
- Locus Award, 1975: Prince of Annwn, 20th place.
- Fritz Leiber Fantasy Award, "Gray Mouser Award", Science Fiction/Fantasy's Fantasy Faire, 1979.
- World Fantasy Convention, Convention Award, 1985.
- Locus Award, 1984: The Sword Is Forged, 26th place.
- World Fantasy Convention, World Fantasy Award for Life Achievement, 1989.

== Bibliography ==
=== Mabinogion tetralogy ===
1. The Virgin and the Swine. November 1936. Republished as The Island of the Mighty. July 1970.
2. The Children of Llyr. August 1971.
3. The Song of Rhiannon. August 1972.
4. Prince of Annwn. November 1974.

=== Other novels ===
- Witch House. September 1945.
- The Cross and the Sword. October 1956.
- The Sword Is Forged. July 1983.
- She Walks in Darkness. Tachyon Publications, September 2013.

=== Collections ===
- Above Ker-Is and Other Stories. March 2012.

=== Short stories ===
- "At the End of the Corridor." 1950.
- "Above Ker-Is." 1978.
- "The Mistress of Kaer-Mor." 1980.
- "The Chinese Woman." 1981.
- "The Judgement of St. Yves." 1981.
- "The Ship from Away." 1982.
- "The Forest That Would Not Be Cut Down." 1985.
- "Cannibal Sorcerer" (with Bruce D. Arthurs). 1993.
- "They That Have Wings." Fantasy & Science Fiction, Nov/Dec 2011.
- "Lus-Mor." 2012.
- "The Other One." 2012.
- "The Tree of Perkunas." 2012.
- "Werewolf." 2012.
