= The Children of Llyr =

1971 novel by Evangeline Walton

- Cover of first edition
- Author: Evangeline Walton
- Cover artist: David Johnston
- Language: English
- Genre: Fantasy
- Publisher: Ballantine Books
- Publication date: 1971
- Publication place: United States
- Media type: Print (paperback)
- Preceded by: Prince of Annwn
- Followed by: The Song of Rhiannon

The Children of Llyr is a fantasy novel by American writer Evangeline Walton, the second in her tetralogy based on the Welsh Mabinogion. It was first published in paperback by Ballantine Books as the thirty-third volume of the Ballantine Adult Fantasy series in August, 1971. It has been reprinted on numerous occasions since, and gathered together with Walton's other Mabinogion novels by Overlook Press as the omnibus The Mabinogion Tetralogy in 2002. The novel has also been published in translation in several European languages.

== Plot summary ==
The novel is a retelling of the story of the Second Branch of the Mabinogion, Branwen Ferch Llŷr (Branwen, Daughter of Llŷr).

Britain is ruled by the children of Llyr and Penarddun, the giant King Bran and his siblings Branwen and Manawyddan, together with their younger half-brothers Nissyen and Evnissyen, the offspring of Penarddun and Euroswydd. Branwen is given in marriage to Matholuch, king of Ireland. Angry that he was not consulted, Evnissyen, a tragic and haunted figure, insults Matholuch by mutilating his horses. Bran placates the Irish king by compensating him with new horses and treasure, including a magical cauldron which can restore the dead to life.

Back in Ireland, Matholuch and Branwen have a son, Gwern, but Evnissyen's insult continues to rankle the Irish and Branwen is banished to the kitchen and beaten every day. Finally she gets a message to Bran, who responds by making war on Matholuch. His army sails across the Irish Sea, but Bran is so huge he wades across. The fearful Matholuch offers peace and agrees to step aside as king of Ireland in favor of Gwern.

Matholwch builds a house big enough to entertain Bran. His followers, unrepentant, conceal themselves in the house inside a hanging hundred bags, supposedly containing flour. Evnissyen, suspecting treachery, reconnoitres the hall and kills the hidden warriors by crushing their heads inside the bags. Later, at the feast, the angry Evnissyen throws Gwern into the fire, precipitating a battle.

The fighting goes against Bran's forces, as the Irish use the magic cauldron to revive their dead. Evnissyen hides among the corpses to have himself thrown in the cauldron, which destroys it, although the effort costs him his life and comes too late for the combatants, almost all of whom are now dead. Only Branwen and seven of Bran's followers survive, notably Manawyddan and Pryderi, prince of Dyved. Bran himself is mortally wounded.

Bran instructs his mourning companions to cut off his head and take it back to Britain. Branwen dies on their return, grief-struck from the ruin caused on her account. Bran's head, magically preserved, continues to live for a time, comforting and entertaining his adherents in a series of enchanted feasts before burial. Of all the children of Llyr only Manawyddan remains.

== Reception ==
Lester del Rey, reviewing the novel in If, writes "the book has a reality of its own. Magic works-sometimes, and more or less. The men in the story are both larger than life and somewhat less than modern men. But they stop being myth figures and become fully realized as human beings. Their world has a balance and a justice unusual in fantasy. This is the way it would have been if the old beliefs could have been true at all." He calls it "thoroughly modern in its style and handling of characters ... timeless in the sense that the very best telling of tales is beyond the limits of any given time and place. It's a first rate book."

The novel was also reviewed by Robin Marcus (1978) in Paperback Parlour, April 1978.

== Awards ==
The novel was nominated for the 1972 Mythopoeic Fantasy Award.

== Relation to other works ==
The novel is part of the author's tetralogy based on the Welsh Mabinogion, the other three novels in the series being The Island of the Mighty (1936), The Song of Rhiannon (1972), and Prince of Annwn (1974).

Preceded by Prince of Annwn	The Mabinogion Tetralogy; The Children of Llyr	Succeeded by The Song of Rhiannon
