= Prince of Annwn =

1974 novel by Evangeline Walton

- Cover of first edition
- Author: Evangeline Walton
- Language: English
- Genre: Fantasy
- Publisher: Ballantine Books
- Publication date: 1974
- Publication place: United States
- Media type: Print (paperback)
- Preceded by: none
- Followed by: The Children of Llyr

Prince of Annwn is a fantasy novel by American writer Evangeline Walton, the first in a series of four based on the Welsh Mabinogion. Originally intended for publication by Ballantine Books as a volume of the celebrated Ballantine Adult Fantasy series, it actually saw print only after the series was discontinued. It was first published in paperback by Ballantine Books in November 1974. It has been reprinted a number of times since, and gathered together with Walton's other Mabinogion novels by Overlook Press as the omnibus The Mabinogion Tetralogy in 2002. The novel has also been published in translation in several European languages. The other three novels in the series are The Island of the Mighty (1936), The Children of Llyr (1971), and The Song of Rhiannon (1972).

The novel is a retelling of the story of the First Branch of the Mabinogi, Pwyll Pendefig Dyfed (Pwyll, Prince of Dyfed), and hence is chronologically the first of Walton's Mabinogion novels, though published last.

== Plot summary ==
Pwyll, the prince of Dyved, offends Arawn, ruler of Annwn (the underworld), by baiting his hunting hounds on a stag that Arawn's dogs had brought down. In recompense he agrees to exchanges places with Arawn for a year. Arawn is pledged to fight his enemy Havgan, whom Walton represents as a member of a conquering eastern pantheon, by whom he is destined to be defeated unless the mortal takes his place.

Pwyll must overcome a number of foes to reach the Land of the Dead, and additional perils on his way to face Havgan, the worst threat of all, a deity whose evil is masked by an attractive beauty. Nonetheless, Pwyll manages to overcome his foe. For the remainder of the year he enjoys the luxury and prerogatives of the lord of Annwn in Arawn's guise, until the time comes to trade places again. He does not, however, sleep with Arawn's wife, thus earning the lord of Annwn's gratitude.

On his return to the mortal realm Pwyll encounters Rhiannon of the Birds, a beautiful maiden whose ambling horse cannot be overtaken. To win her hand he must overcome Gwawl, a rival suitor to whom she is betrothed. He ultimately succeeds by trapping Gwawl in a magic bag that can never be filled and having him beaten to death in the bag.

Pwyll and Rhiannon have a son, but the baby disappears the night after his birth, and the mother, suspected of murdering him, is sentenced to a humiliating punishment. In fact the child was taken by a monster who preys on newborns. The beast has also been raiding the stables of Teyrnon; returning to carry off the latest foal, it is surprised by the now watchful owner, who manages to rescue both foal and child.

Teyrnon and his wife name the boy Gwri Golden Hair and raise him as their own. As Gwri grows up he increasingly resembles his real father; realizing who he is, Teyrnon returns him to his true parents. Rhiannon is released from her ordeal, and the boy is renamed Pryderi ("worry").

Preceded by none	The Mabinogion Tetralogy; Prince of Annwn	Succeeded by The Children of Llyr
