= The Island of the Mighty =

1936 novel by Evangeline Walton

- Cover of first paperback edition
- Author: Evangeline Walton
- Original title: The Virgin and the Swine
- Cover artist: Bob Pepper
- Language: English
- Genre: Fantasy
- Publisher: Ballantine Books
- Publication date: 1936
- Publication place: United States
- Media type: Print (hardback)
- Preceded by: The Song of Rhiannon

The Island of the Mighty is a fantasy novel by American writer Evangeline Walton, the earliest in a series of four based on the Welsh Mabinogion. It was first published in 1936 under the publisher's title of The Virgin and the Swine. Although it received warm praise from John Cowper Powys, the book sold poorly, and as a result none of the other novels in the series reached print at the time. Later rediscovered by Ballantine Books, it was reissued under the present title as the eighteenth volume of the Ballantine Adult Fantasy series in July, 1970, with an introduction by Lin Carter and a cover by Bob Pepper. It has been reprinted a number of times since, and gathered together with Walton's other Mabinogion novels by Overlook Press as the omnibus The Mabinogion Tetralogy in 2002. The novel has also been published in translation in several European languages.

The novel is a retelling of the story of the Fourth Branch of the Mabinogion, Math Fab Mathonwy (Math, son of Mathonwy), and hence is chronologically last in Walton's Mabinogion novels, though published first. The three other novels in the series are The Children of Llyr (1971), The Song of Rhiannon (1972), and Prince of Annwn (1974).

== Plot summary ==
Gwynedd in north Wales is ruled by Math, son of Mathonwy, whose feet must be held by a virgin at all times except while he is at war. Math's nephew Gilfaethwy is in love with Goewin, the current footholder, and Gilfaethwy's brother Gwydion tricks Math into going to war against Pryderi so Gilfaethwy can have access to her. Gwydion kills Pryderi, Prince of Dyfed, in single combat, and Gilfaethwy rapes Goewin. Math marries Goewin in compensation for her rape, and banishes Gwydion and Gilfaethwy, transforming them into a breeding pair of deer, then pigs, then wolves. After three years they are restored to human form and return.

Math needs a new footholder, and Gwydion suggests his sister, Arianrhod, but when Math magically tests her virginity, she gives birth to two sons. One, Dylan, immediately takes to the sea. The other is raised by Gwydion, but Arianrhod swears that he will never have a name or arms unless she gives them to him, and refuses to do so. Gwydion tricks her into naming him Llew Llaw Gyffes (Llew Skilful Hand) and giving him arms. She then swears he will never have a wife of any race living on earth, so Gwydion and Math make him a beautiful wife from flowers, and name her Blodeuwedd ("Flowers"). Blodeuwedd falls in love with a passing hunter called Goronwy, and they plot to kill Llew. Blodewedd tricks Llew into revealing the means by which he can be killed, but when Goronwy attempts to do the deed, Llew escapes, though wounded, transformed into an eagle.

Gwydion finds Llew and transforms him back into human form, and turns Blodeuwedd into an owl (Blodeuwedd, literally "Flower Face," means "Owl"). Goronwy offers to compensate Llew, but Llew insists on returning the blow that was struck against him. He kills Goronwy with his spear, which is thrown so hard it pierces him through the stone he is hiding behind.

Preceded by The Song of Rhiannon	The Mabinogion Tetralogy; The Island of the Mighty	Succeeded by none
