= The Song of Rhiannon =

1972 novel by Evangeline Walton

- Cover of first edition
- Author: Evangeline Walton
- Cover artist: David Johnston
- Language: English
- Genre: Fantasy
- Publisher: Ballantine Books
- Publication date: 1972
- Publication place: United States
- Media type: Print (paperback)
- Preceded by: The Children of Llyr
- Followed by: The Island of the Mighty

The Song of Rhiannon is a fantasy novel by American writer Evangeline Walton, the third in a series of four based on the Welsh Mabinogion. It was first published in paperback by Ballantine Books as the fifty-first volume of the Ballantine Adult Fantasy series in August, 1972. It has been reprinted a number of times since, and gathered together with Walton's other Mabinogion novels by Overlook Press as the omnibus The Mabinogion Tetralogy in 2002. The novel has also been published in translation in several European languages. The other three novels in the series are The Island of the Mighty (1936), The Children of Llyr (1971), and Prince of Annwn (1974).

The novel is a retelling of the story of the Third Branch of the Mabinogi, Manawydan Fab Llŷr (Manawyddan, son of Llŷr).

== Plot summary ==
In the wake of the tragedy that befell the Children of Llyr, Prince Pryderi of Dyved returns to his realm with Manawyddan, the last survivor of the family. There Pryderi is reunited with his wife Cigfa and Manawyddan marries Pryderi's mother Rhiannon.

An enchantment descends on the land, leaving it a wasteland empty of all domesticated animals and humans apart from the four protagonists. They support themselves by hunting at first, then move to the larger realm of Llogres where they make a living making saddles, shields and shoes. Their work is of such quality that the local craftsmen cannot compete, and drive them from town to town.

Finally they return to Dyved and become hunters again. Pryderi and Manawyddan follow a white boar to a mysterious castle. Against Manawyddan's advice Pryderi goes inside, and does not return. Rhiannon goes to investigate and finds Pryderi clinging to a bowl, unable to speak. The same fate befalls her, and the castle disappears.

Manawyddan and Cigfa return to Llogres as shoemakers, but are once again forced to leave so they return to Dyved. They sow three fields of wheat, but the first is destroyed before it can be harvested. The next night the second field is destroyed. Manawyddan watches over the third field, sees it destroyed by mice, and catches one of them. He decides to hang it for theft the next day.

Three strangers turn up in succession to offer him gifts if he will spare the mouse. Manawyddan refuses. Asked by the third stranger what he wishes in return for the mouse's life, he demands the release of Pryderi and Rhiannon and the lifting of the curse from Dyved. The stranger agrees to these terms, and his captives are freed and the land restored. He reveals himself as Llwyd, an ally of Gwawl, whom Pryderi's father Pwyll had beaten in order to get Gwawl to give up his right to Rhiannon's hand, which Gwawl had won from Pwyll by trickery. The mice who destroyed Manawyddan's crops were his attendants, magically transformed, and the one Manawyddan captured is Llwyd's own pregnant wife. He had placed the enchantment on Dyved in vengeance for Gwawl's beating and humiliation.

== Awards ==
The Song of Rhiannon received the 1973 Mythopoeic Award for Best Novel.

Preceded by The Children of Llyr	The Mabinogion Tetralogy; The Song of Rhiannon	Succeeded by The Island of the Mighty
