= Math fab Mathonwy (branch) =

Medieval Welsh legendary tale

- "Math, the son of Mathonwy"
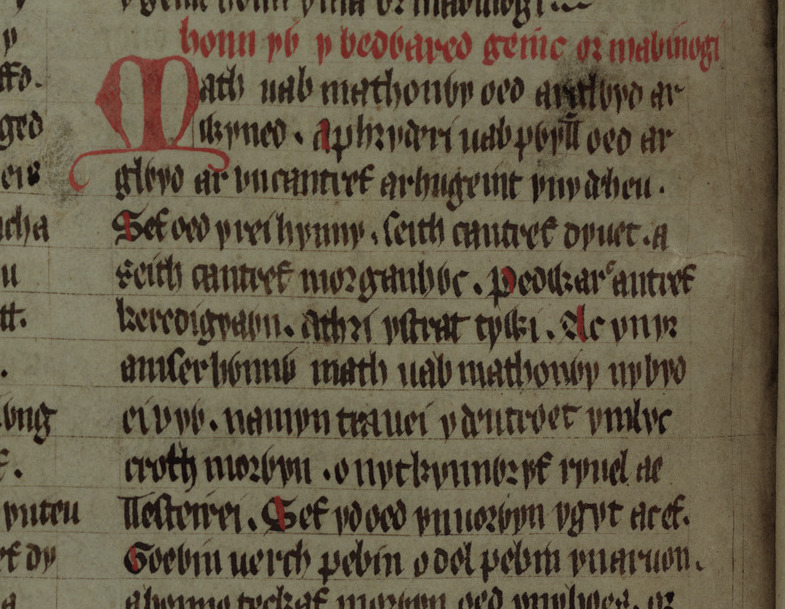
- Opening lines of the fourth branch of the Mabinogi in the Red Book of Hergest: Math son of Mathonwy was Lord of Gwynedd. And Pryderi, son of Pwyll, was Lord of twenty-one 'hundreds' in the south.
- Author(s): Unknown, generally believed to be a scribe from Dyfed.
- Language: Middle Welsh
- Date: Earliest manuscript dates to 14th century; tale believed to be much older.
- Series: Four Branches of the Mabinogi
- Genre: Welsh mythology
- Subject: Fourth branch of the Mabinogi. Death of Pryderi, birth of Lleu, creation of Blodeuwedd, death and resurrection of Lleu.
- Setting: Mainly Gwynedd, also Dyfed,
- Period covered: Mythological
- Personages: Gwydion, Lleu, Math, Blodeuwedd, Gronw Pebr, Arianrhod, Pryderi, Goewin, Gilfaethwy

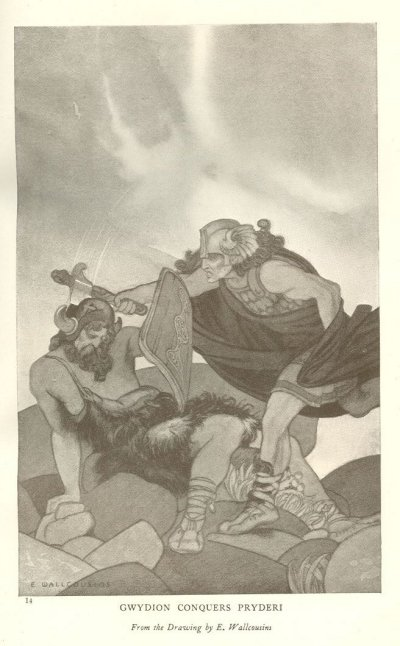
Pryderi's death in single combat, by Ernest Wallcousins

Math fab Mathonwy, "Math, the son of Mathonwy" is a legendary tale from medieval Welsh literature and the final of the four branches of the Mabinogi. It tells of a vicious war between the north and the south, of the birth of Lleu Llaw Gyffes and Dylan ail Don, of the tyngedau of Arianrhod, and of the creation of Blodeuwedd, a woman made of flowers. The chief characters of the tale are Math, king of Gwynedd, his nephew Gwydion, a magician, warrior and trickster, and Gwydion's own nephew, Lleu, cursed by his mother Arianrhod.

Along with the other branches, the tale can be found in the medieval Red Book of Hergest and White Book of Rhydderch. Allusions to the tale can be found in two old triads retained in the Trioedd Ynys Prydain.

== Synopsis ==
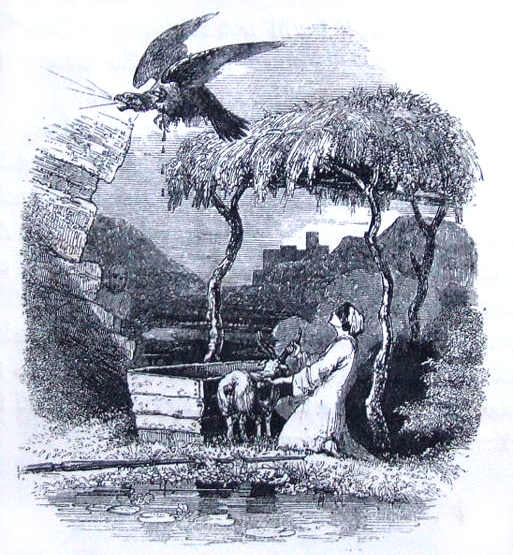
Lleu rises in the form of an eagle. Image from The Mabinogion, translated by Charlotte Guest, 1877.

Blodeuwedd meets Gronw, by Ernest Wallcousins

=== War with the south ===
Gilfaethwy, nephew to the Venedotian king, Math fab Mathonwy, falls in love with his uncle's virgin foot-holder, Goewin. His brother Gwydion conspires to start a war between the north and the south, so as give the brothers the opportunity to rape Goewin while Math is distracted. To this end, Gwydion employs his magic powers to steal a number of otherworldly pigs from the Demetian king, Pryderi, who retaliates by marching on Gwynedd. Meanwhile, Gwydion and Gilfaethwy attack and rape Goewin.

Pryderi and his men march north and fight a battle between Maenor Bennardd and Maenor Coed Alun, but are forced to retreat. He is pursued to Nant Call, where more of his men are slaughtered, and then to Dol Benmaen, where he suffers a third defeat. To avoid further bloodshed, it is agreed that the outcome of the battle should be decided by single combat between Gwydion and Pryderi. The two contenders meet at a place called Y Velen Rhyd in Ardudwy, and "because of strength and valour and magic and enchantment", Gwydion triumphs and Pryderi is killed. The men of Dyfed retreat back to their own land, lamenting over the death of their lord.

=== Birth of Lleu ===
When Math hears of the assault on Goewin, he turns his nephews into a series of mated pairs of animals: Gwydion becomes a stag for a year, then a sow and finally a wolf. Gilfaethwy becomes a hind deer, a boar and a she-wolf. Each year they produce an offspring which is sent to Math: Hyddwn, Hychddwn and Bleiddwn. After three years, Math releases his nephews from their punishment and begins the search for a new foot-holder. Gwydion suggests his sister Arianrhod, who is magically tested for virginity by Math. During the test, she gives birth to a "sturdy boy with thick yellow hair" whom Math names Dylan and who takes on the nature of the seas until his death at his uncle Gofannon's hands.

Ashamed, Arianrhod runs to the door, but on her way out something small drops from her, which Gwydion wraps up and places in a chest at the foot of his bed. Some time later, he hears screams from within the chest, and opens it to discover a baby boy. Some scholars have suggested that it is implicit that Gwydion was the father of Arianrhod's sons.

=== The tynghedau of Arianrhod ===
Some years later, Gwydion accompanies the boy to Caer Arianrhod, and presents him to his mother. The furious Arianrhod, shamed by this reminder of her loss of virginity, places a tynged on the boy: that only she could give him a name. Gwydion however tricks his sister by disguising himself and the boy as cobblers and luring Arianrhod into going to them in person in order to have some shoes made for her. The boy throws a stone and strikes a wren "between the tendon and the bone of its leg", causing Arianrhod to make the remark "it is with a skillful hand that the fair-haired one has hit it ". At that Gwydion reveals himself, saying Lleu Llaw Gyffes; "the fair-haired one with the skillful hand, is his name now". Furious at this trickery, Arianrhod places another tynged on Lleu: he shall receive arms from no one but Arianrhod herself. Gwydion tricks his sister once again, and she unwittingly arms Lleu herself, leading to her placing a third tynged on him: that he shall never have a human wife.

So as to counteract Arianrhod's curse, Math and Gwydion:

[take] the flowers of the oak, and the flowers of the broom, and the flowers of the meadowsweet, and from those they conjured up the fairest and most beautiful maiden anyone had ever seen. And they baptized her in the way that they did at that time, and named her Blodeuedd.

=== Lleu and Blodeuwedd ===
While Lleu is away on business, Blodeuwedd has an affair with Gronw Pebr, the lord of Penllyn, and the two conspire to murder Lleu. Blodeuwedd tricks Lleu into revealing how he may be killed, since he can not be killed during the day or night, nor indoors or outdoors, neither riding nor walking, not clothed and not naked, nor by any weapon lawfully made. He reveals to her that he can only be killed at dusk, wrapped in a net with one foot on a cauldron and one on a goat and with a spear forged for a year during the hours when everyone is at mass. With this information she arranges his death.

Struck by the spear thrown by Gronw's hand, Lleu transforms into an eagle and flies away. Gwydion tracks him down and finds him perched high on an oak tree. Through the singing of an englyn (known as englyn Gwydion) he lures him down from the oak tree and switches him back to his human form. Gwydion and Math nurse Lleu back to health before mustering Gwynedd and reclaiming his lands from Gronw and Blodeuwedd.

Gwydion overtakes a fleeing Blodeuwedd and turns her into an owl, the creature hated by all other birds, proclaiming:

You will not dare to show your face ever again in the light of day ever again, and that will be because of enmity between you and all other birds. It will be in their nature to harass you and despise you wherever they find you. And you will not lose your name – that will always be "Bloddeuwedd (Flower-face)."

The narrative adds:

Blodeuwedd means "owl" in the language of today. And it is because of that there is hostility between birds and owls, and the owl is still known as Blodeuwedd.

Meanwhile, Gronw escapes to Penllyn and sends emissaries to Lleu to beg of his forgiveness. Lleu refuses, demanding that Gronw must stand on the bank of the River Cynfael and receive a blow from his spear. Gronw desperately asks if anyone from his warband will take the spear in his place, but his men refuse his plea. Eventually, Gronw agrees to receive the blow on the condition that he may place a large stone between himself and Lleu, who allows him to do so before throwing the spear with such strength that it pierces the stone, killing his rival. A holed stone in Ardudwy is still known as Llech Ronw (Gronw's Stone).

The tale ends with Lleu ascending to the throne of Gwynedd.

== Sample text ==
The following excerpt is the beginning of the tale. The text is presented both in its Middle Welsh form and in Modern Welsh spelling, with glosses of each word and the translation by Sioned Davies.

Middle Welsh spelling	Modern Welsh spelling	Translation
Math uab Mathonwy oed arglwyd ar Wyned, a Pryderi uab Pwyll oed arglwyd ar un cantref ar ugeint yn y Deheu.	Math fab Mathonwy oedd arglwydd ar Wynedd, ac Pryderi fab Pwyll oedd arglwydd ar un cantref ar hugain yn y Deheu.	Math son of Mathonwy was lord over Gwynedd, and Pryderi son of Pwyll was lord over twenty-one cantrefs in the south,
mab: son; oed: 3rd person imperfect of bot, ‘to be’; arglwyd: lord; ar: on (+lenition); Gwynedd: place name; a, ac: and (+aspiration); un: one; cantref: land division; ugeint: twenty; yn: in (+nasalisation); y, yr, ’r: the (+lenition of most feminine singular nouns); Deheu: South.		Math son of Mathonwy was lord over Gwynedd, and Pryderi son of Pwyll was lord over twenty-one cantrefs in the south,
Sef oed y rei hynny, seith cantref Dyuet, a seith Morgannhwc, a phedwar Kyredigyawn, a thri Ystrat Tywi.	Sef oedd y rhai hynny, saith gantref Dyfed, a saith Morgannwg, a phedwar cantref Ceredigion, a thri Ystrad Tywi.	namely the seven cantrefs of Dyfed, and the seven of Morgannwg, and the four of Ceredigion, and the three of Ystrad Tywi.
sef: this is what; rei: some; hynny: demonstrative pronoun plural ‘those’; seith: seven; pedwar: four; tri: three (+nasalisation).		namely the seven cantrefs of Dyfed, and the seven of Morgannwg, and the four of Ceredigion, and the three of Ystrad Tywi.
Ac yn yr oes honno Math uab Mathonwy ny bydei uyw, namyn tra uei y deudroet ymlyc croth morwyn, onyt kynrwyf ryuel a’y llesterei.	Ac yn yr oes honno Math fab Mathonwy ni fyddai byw, namyn tra fai y deu droed ymhlŷg croth morwyn, onid cynnwrf rhyfel a’i llesteiriai.	At that time Math son of Mathonwy could not live unless his feet were in the lap of a virgin, except when the turmoil of war prevented him.
ac: and (+aspiration); yr: the; oes: age, time; honno: demonstrative pronoun singular masculine ‘that’; ny: negative particle (+lenition); bydei: habitual past 3rd singular of bot; byw: to live; namyn: except; tra: while (+lenition); bei: imperfect sunbjunctive 3rd singular of bot; y: his (+lenition); deu: two (+lenition); troet: foot; ymlyc: enfolded; croth: belly, lap; morwyn: maiden; onyt: unless; kynrwyf: commotion, tumult; ryuel: war; a’y: relative particle a (+lenition)+ possessive pronoun 3rd singular masculine y (+lenition); llesterei: 3rd singular imperfect of llesterio, ‘to hinder, obstruct’.		At that time Math son of Mathonwy could not live unless his feet were in the lap of a virgin, except when the turmoil of war prevented him.
Sef oed yn uorwyn gyt ac ef, Goewin uerch Pebin o Dol Pebin yn Aruon.	Sef oedd yn forwyn gyd ac ef, Goewin ferch Pebin o Ddôl Pebin yn Arfon.	The maiden who was with him was Goewin daughter of Pebin from Dol Pebin in Arfon.
yn: predicative particle (+lenition); gyt: together; ac: with (+aspiration); ef: with; merch: daughter; o: of, from (+lenition).		The maiden who was with him was Goewin daughter of Pebin from Dol Pebin in Arfon.
A honno teccaf morwyn oed yn y hoes o’r a wydit yno.	A honno tecaf morwyn oedd yn ei hoes o’r a wyddid yno.	And she was the fairest maiden of her generation known at that time.
teccaf: superlative of tec, ‘fair’; gwydit: imperfect impersonal of gwybot, ‘to know’.		And she was the fairest maiden of her generation known at that time.
Ac ynteu yg Kaer Dathyl yn Aruon yd oed y wastatrwyd.	Ac yntau yng Nghaer Dathyl yn Arfon yd oedd y wastadrwydd.	Math found peace at Caer Dathyl in Arfon.
ynteu: pronoun 3rd singular masculine; yd: preverbal particle; gwastatrwyd: tranquility.		Math found peace at Caer Dathyl in Arfon.
Ac ny allei gylchu y wlat, namyn Giluathwy uab Don, a Gwydyon uab Don, y nyeint ueibon y chwaer, a’r teulu gyt ac wy a aei y gylchu y wlat drostaw.	Ac ni allai gylchu ei wlad, namyn Gilfaethwy fab Don, a Gwydion fab Don, y neiaint feibion ei chwaer, a’r teulu gyd ac wy a âi y gylchu y wlad drostaw.	He was unable to circuit the land, but Gilfaethwy son of Dôn and Gwydion son of Dôn, his nephews, sons of his sister, together with the retinue would circuit the land on his behalf.
allei: 3rd person singular imperfect of gallu, ‘to be able’; cylchu: to circle (verbal noun); gwlat: country, land; nyeint: plural of nai, “nephew”; meibon: plural of mab; chwaer: sister; teulu: household, court; wy: pronoun 3rd plural; aei: 3rd singular imperfect of myned, ‘to go’; drostaw: conjugated preposition, 3rd singular masc of dros, ‘instead of’.		He was unable to circuit the land, but Gilfaethwy son of Dôn and Gwydion son of Dôn, his nephews, sons of his sister, together with the retinue would circuit the land on his behalf.
A’r uorwyn oed gyt a Math yn wastat; ac ynteu Giluaethwy uab Don a dodes y uryt ar y uorwyn, a’y charu hyt na wydat beth a wnay ymdanei.	A’r forwyn oedd gyd a Math yn wastad; ac yntau Gilfaethwy fab Don a ddodes ei fryd ar y forwyn, a’i charu hyd na wyddai beth a wnai am dani.	The maiden was always with Math. But Gilfaethwy son of Dôn set his heart on the maiden, and loved her to the extent that he did not know what to do about it.
gwastat: constantly; ynteu: but, however; dodes: preterite 3rd singular of dodi, ‘to put, place’; bryt: mind, thought; y: 3rd singular feminine poss. pronoun (+aspiration); caru: to love (verbal noun); hyt: until; na: negative relative particle (+len); gwydat: 3rd singular imperfect of gwybod ‘know’; beth: what; gwnay: 3rd singular imperfect of gwneuthur, ‘to do’; ymdanei: conjugated preposition 3rd singular feminine am, ‘about’.		The maiden was always with Math. But Gilfaethwy son of Dôn set his heart on the maiden, and loved her to the extent that he did not know what to do about it.
Ac nachaf y liw a’y wed a’y ansawd yn atueilaw o’y charyat, hyt nat oed hawd y adnabot.	Ac nachaf ei liw a’i wedd a’i ansawdd un adfeilio o’i chariad, hyd nad oedd hawdd ei adnabod.	And behold, his colour and face and form were wasting away because of his love for her, so that it was not easy to recognise him.
nachaf: lo!; lliw: colour; gwed: form; ansawd: appearance; atueilaw: to waste away; caryat: love; nat: variant form of na; hawd: easy; adnabot: to recognise		And behold, his colour and face and form were wasting away because of his love for her, so that it was not easy to recognise him.

== Editions ==
For editions of the Four Branches containing this text, see Four Branches of the Mabinogi. Editions of this branch specifically are:

- Ian Hughes (ed.), Math Uab Mathonwy: The Fourth Branch of the Mabinogi. Dublin: Dublin Institute for Advanced Studies, School of Celtic Studies, 2013, ISBN 978-1-85500-222-7
- Patrick K. Ford (ed.), Math uab Mathonwy. Belmont, Mass.: Ford and Bailie, 1999
