= Eufydd fab Dôn =

Minor figure in Welsh mythology

Eufydd fab Dôn is a minor figure in Welsh mythology, the son of the mother goddess Dôn and brother to the better-known figures of Gwydion, Amaethon, Gofannon and Arianrhod. It has been suggested that he derives from the Gaulish god Ogmios and is cognate to the Irish hero Oghma Grianainech.

== Role in Welsh tradition ==
Eufydd appears in a number of Welsh texts, spelled variously as Euuyd, Eueyed, Euyd and Ieunydd. He appears twice in the Book of Taliesin; first in Prif Gyfarch Taliesin in which it is stated:

And I have been with artful men,
With old Math, with Gofannon,
With Eufydd, with Elestron,
Mighty men my companions.

and then again in Marwnat Aeddon:

When this chief came from Gwydion's land, from Seon's stronghold
A bitter business, four shaved heads coming at midnight –
Warriors fell, with nowhere to hide in the woods, the wind raging.
Math and Eufydd would make by magic a free man, a skillful one.
In Gwydion's days and Amaethon's, then there was wisdom.

The implication is that Eufydd was remembered in Welsh tradition as a skilled magician, intimately associated with his more illustrious brothers Gwydion and Gofannon, and with his uncle Math fab Mathonwy.

Eufydd also appears in the genealogical tract Bonedd yr Arwyr (The Descent of the Saints) in which he is listed among the children of Dôn.

=== Associations with Hefeydd Hen ===
It has been suggested that Eufydd can be identified with Hefeydd Hen, the father of Rhiannon who appears prominently in the first branch of the Mabinogi.
