= Vera historia de morte Arthuri =

12th- or 13th-century Latin text

Vera historia de morte Arthuri (The True History of the Death of Arthur) is a short, anonymous 12th- or 13th-century Latin text relating the story of King Arthur's last journey to the Isle of Avalon – which, uniquely, it locates in North Wales – and the disappearance there of his body. It may have been written at Aberconwy Abbey. It has been seen as a reaction to the brief and uncircumstantial mention of Arthur's death given in Geoffrey of Monmouth's Historia Regum Britanniae, and perhaps also to Glastonbury Abbey's claim to be Arthur's place of burial. It survives in six manuscripts, but was unknown to 19th-century scholars and little known for most of the 20th century, not being published in English translation until 1979 or in the original Latin until 1981.

== Synopsis ==
At the end of the battle between King Arthur and Mordred, Mordred and many others were dead and Arthur was dangerously wounded. Giving thanks to God and the Virgin Mary for his victory, he ordered four of his men to remove his armour, but was then further wounded with a poisoned elm spear by a handsome young man. Arthur retaliated with a spear of his own, killing the man. Knowing he had not long to live he ordered the four men to take him to Avalon in Gwynedd. There he was treated ineffectually by doctors and, in the presence of the Archbishop of London and two bishops (the Archbishop of Menevia being unavailable), bequeathed his kingdom to Constantine son of Cador and commended his spirit to his Redeemer. The king's body was prepared for burial and taken, as he had always wished, to a nearby chapel dedicated to the Virgin Mary. Arthur's body could not, on account of its great size, be got through the narrow chapel door, so was left outside. As the bishops performed the last rites a great storm broke out and a thick mist hid everything from view. When the storm and mist lifted the body was found to have vanished and a new stone tomb to have appeared. Even now there is disagreement as to what happened, some saying that Arthur is still alive and some that he is in his tomb. Arthur's reign lasted for thirty-nine years, and Constantine succeeded him.

== Manuscripts ==
Six manuscripts of the Vera historia have been identified:

- London, BL Cotton Cleopatra MS D. III (c. 1314). One of the two earliest surviving MSS. This abbreviated version of Vera historia is incorporated into the Chronicle of Hailes Abbey.
- London, BL Cotton Titus MS A. xix (late 15th century).
- London, Gray's Inn MS 7 (c. 1340). One of the two earliest surviving MSS. It was previously owned by the Franciscan friary in Chester.
- Oxford, Bodleian Library MS Digby 186 (early 16th century). A fragmentary text. May be a direct copy of BL Cotton Titus MS A. xix (see above).
- Paris, Bibliothèque de l'Arsenal MS 982 (3rd quarter of the 14th century). Contains the First Variant version of Geoffrey of Monmouth's Historia regum Britanniae, into which the Vera historia is interpolated at the end of Geoffrey's account of the Battle of Camlann.
- Paris, Bibliothèque nationale MS Lat. 6041D (late 14th century). Included at the end of an abbreviated version of the First Variant of the Historia regum Britanniae.

== Date and place of composition ==
The date of the Vera historia cannot be pinned down with any certainty, though its clear debt to the Historia Regum Britanniae (c. 1136) and the date of its earliest manuscripts show that it must have been written some time between the mid-12th century and the late 13th century. One mention in the text of an archbishop of St Davids opens the possibility that it was written at the beginning of the 13th century, when the churchman Gerald of Wales and others were negotiating for St Davids to be recognized as a metropolitan see. By an alternative line of reasoning, the Vera historia's claim that Avalon, Arthur's resting place, was in Gwynedd, and silence as to the alternative identification of Avalon with Glastonbury, could point to its being written before the alleged discovery of King Arthur's body at Glastonbury c. 1190.

The fact that the two oldest manuscripts were formerly held by religious houses in the Welsh Marches, combined with the location of the story in Gwynedd, suggests that this work was written in Wales. More specifically, it may be a product of Aberconwy Abbey in Conwy, Gwynedd, a Cistercian monastery founded by Llywelyn ap Iorwerth in 1198. Llywelyn was a supporter of the campaign to recognize St Davids as an archbishopric; his foundation at Aberconwy was often involved in his diplomatic causes; and it is also known to have had links with Hailes Abbey, whose chronicle incorporated a shortened version of the Vera historia.

== Sources ==
One very obvious source is Geoffrey of Monmouth's Historia Regum Britanniae, the Vera historia serving as a continuation of the history of Arthur given there, elaborating on Geoffrey's bald and summary account of Arthur's death. Some scholars who date the Vera historia to the 1190s or 1200s also see it as a reaction to accounts of the discovery of King Arthur's body at Glastonbury Abbey, the "true history" as opposed to the false Glastonbury one, placing his funeral and possible burial at a church in Gwynedd which perhaps can be identified with Aberconwy Abbey itself, or alternatively with Rhyd Llanfair near Pentrefoelas.

The story is clearly full of elements taken from the world of Celtic myth and legend, even if their sources are not always precisely identifiable. The handsome youth on horseback who wounds Arthur with an elm-shaft sharper than any lance and poisoned with adder venom seems to be one example. This episode has been connected with the killing of Lleu Llaw Gyffes by Gronw Pebyr in the fourth branch of the Mabinogi, and with the wounding of Arthur at Camlann by a poisoned arrow fired by Mordred, as recorded in 19th-century Cornish folklore. An adder also figures in accounts of the battle of Camlann in the Stanzaic Morte Arthur, suggesting the possibility that both this and the Vera historia were drawing on some Welsh mention in a lost source of Arthur's death being caused by an adder. There are further parallels, perhaps unrelated, in a Spanish chronicle and in Livy's description of the death of Romulus. The mystery surrounding Arthur's burial recalls the line in Englynion y Beddau, "The world's wonder a grave for Arthur", and Arthur's veneration for the Virgin Mary also appears in the Historia Brittonum. The appearance of a sudden storm and mist has analogues in a variety of texts, including two passages from the third branch of the Mabinogi, Chrétien de Troyes' romance Yvain, and the Gospel of Luke's account of the Crucifixion.

== Editions ==
The existence of the Vera historia was unknown until as late as 1905. The palaeographer N. R. Ker drew attention to the significance of the work in 1969, but it had to wait until 1981 for a complete edition.

- Lapidge, Michael (1981). "An edition of the Vera historia de morte Arthuri". Arthurian Literature. 1: 79–93. ISBN 9780859910811.
- Lapidge, Michael (2001). "The Vera historia de morte Arthuri: a new edition". In Carley, James P. (ed.). Glastonbury Abbey and the Arthurian Tradition. Arthurian Studies, 44. Cambridge: D. S. Brewer. pp. 115–141. ISBN 9780859915724.

== Translations ==
- Barber, Richard (1979). The Arthurian Legends: An Illustrated Anthology. Woodbridge: Boydell Press. pp. 30–32. ISBN 9780851151106.
- Lapidge, Michael (1981). "An edition of the Vera historia de morte Arthuri". Arthurian Literature. 1: 79–93. ISBN 9780859910811.
- Lapidge, Michael (2001). "The Vera historia de morte Arthuri: a new edition". In Carley, James P. (ed.). Glastonbury Abbey and the Arthurian Tradition. Arthurian Studies, 44. Cambridge: D. S. Brewer. pp. 115–141. ISBN 9780859915724.
