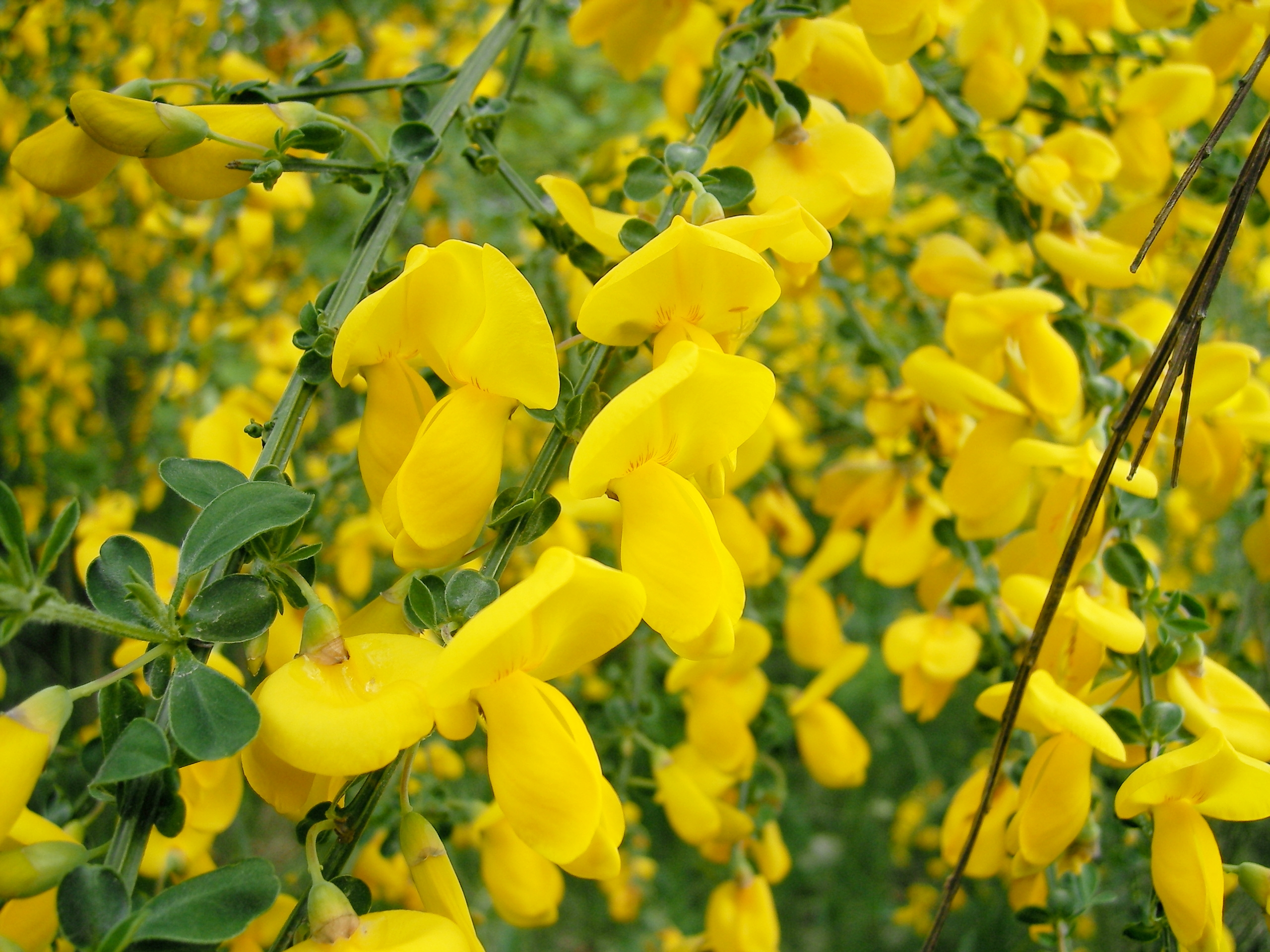
- Common broom

Scientific classification
- Kingdom: Plantae
- Clade: Tracheophytes
- Clade: Angiosperms
- Clade: Eudicots
- Clade: Rosids
- Order: Fabales
- Family: Fabaceae
- Subfamily: Faboideae
- Genus: Cytisus
- Species: C. scoparius

Binomial name
- Cytisus scoparius (L.) Link

Synonyms
- List: Sarothamnus bourgaei Boiss.; Sarothamnus oxyphyllus Boiss.; Sarothamnus scoparius (L.) W.D.J.Koch; Sarothamnus vulgaris Wimm.; Spartium scoparium L.

= Cytisus scoparius =

Ornamental broom shrub

Cytisus scoparius (syn. Sarothamnus scoparius), the common broom or Scotch broom, is a deciduous leguminous shrub native to western and central Europe. In Great Britain and Ireland, the standard name is broom; this name is also used for other members of the Genisteae tribe, such as French broom or Spanish broom; and the term common broom is sometimes used for clarification. In other English-speaking countries, the most common name is "Scotch broom" (or Scots broom); however, it is known as English broom in Australia.

Though this plant is native to Europe, it has spread to many other parts of the world with human introduction. Scotch broom is now common in certain areas of North America and South America, and is considered an invasive species. In North America, Scotch broom was frequently planted in gardens, and was later used for erosion control along highway cuts and fills. Scotch broom is slightly toxic and unpalatable to livestock, and its seeds are viable for up to ten years, allowing them to regrow many years later, after extermination of the plant.

== Description ==
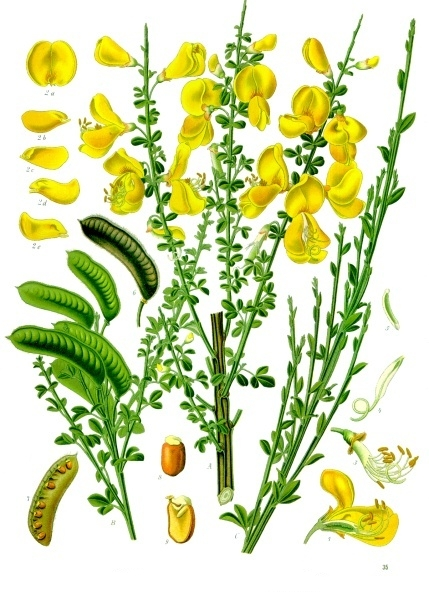
Illustration of C. scoparius from Köhler's Medicinal Plants (1887)

Plants of C. scoparius typically grow to 1–3 metres (3 1/2–10 feet) tall, rarely to 4 m (13 ft), with main stems up to 5 centimetres (2 inches) thick, rarely 10 cm (4 in). Stems are ridged and green. The shrubs have green shoots with small deciduous trifoliate leaves 5–15 millimetres (1/4–5/8 in) long, and in spring and summer are covered in profuse golden yellow flowers 20–30 mm (3/4–1 1/8 in) from top to bottom and 15–20 mm wide. Flowering occurs after 50–80 growing degree-days. The seed pods have long hairs only along their seams. In late summer, its legumes (seed pods) mature black, 2–3 cm (3/4–1 1/4 in) long, 8 mm (3/8 in) broad and 2–3 mm thick; they burst open, often with an audible crack, forcibly throwing seed from the parent plant. This species is adapted to Mediterranean and coastal climates, and its range is limited by cold winter temperatures. It also adapts to windy oceanic climates. The seeds, seedlings, and young shoots are sensitive to frost; adult plants are hardier, and branches affected by freezing temperatures regenerate quickly. C. scoparius contains toxic alkaloids that depress the heart and nervous system.

As a legume, this shrub can fix nitrogen in the soil through a symbiotic relationship with Rhizobium bacteria.

=== Phytochemicals ===
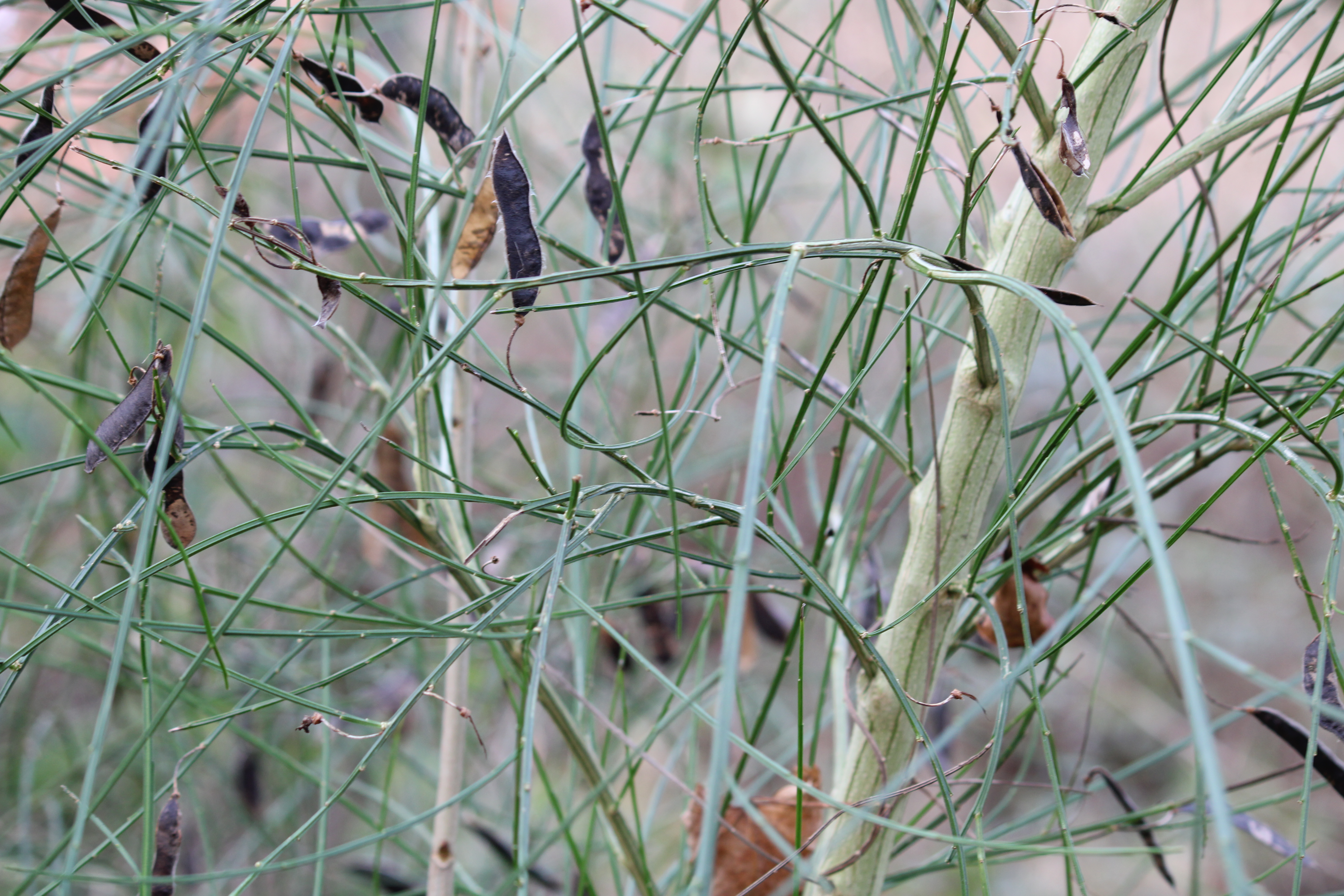
Broom near Frederikshavn, Denmark during winter. Note that the seed pods turn black

One of the main alkaloids of this plant is cytisine. The characteristic constituents are biogenic amines (mostly tyramine in the young shoots), flavonoids (spiraeoside and scoparoside), isoflavones and their glycosides (genistin), as well as allelopathic quinolizidine alkaloids (mostly sparteine, lupanine, scoparin and hydroxy-derivatives), which defend the plant against insect infestation and herbivores (with the exception of the resistant aphid species Aphis cytisorum).

== Classification ==
There are two subspecies of Cytisus scoparius:

- Cytisus scoparius subsp. scoparius - throughout the species' range.
- Cytisus scoparius subsp. maritimus (Rouy) Heywood - Western European maritime cliffs and associated environments; differs with prostrate growth; not over 0.4 m tall; downy young shoots.

== Distribution and habitat ==
Cytisus scoparius is native to western and central Europe, being common in Great Britain and Republic of Ireland. It is found in sunny sites, usually on dry, sandy soils at low altitudes, tolerating very acidic soil conditions.

Outside of its native range, it is an ecologically destructive colonizing invasive species in grassland, shrub and woodland, and other habitats.

== Ecology ==
=== As an invasive species ===
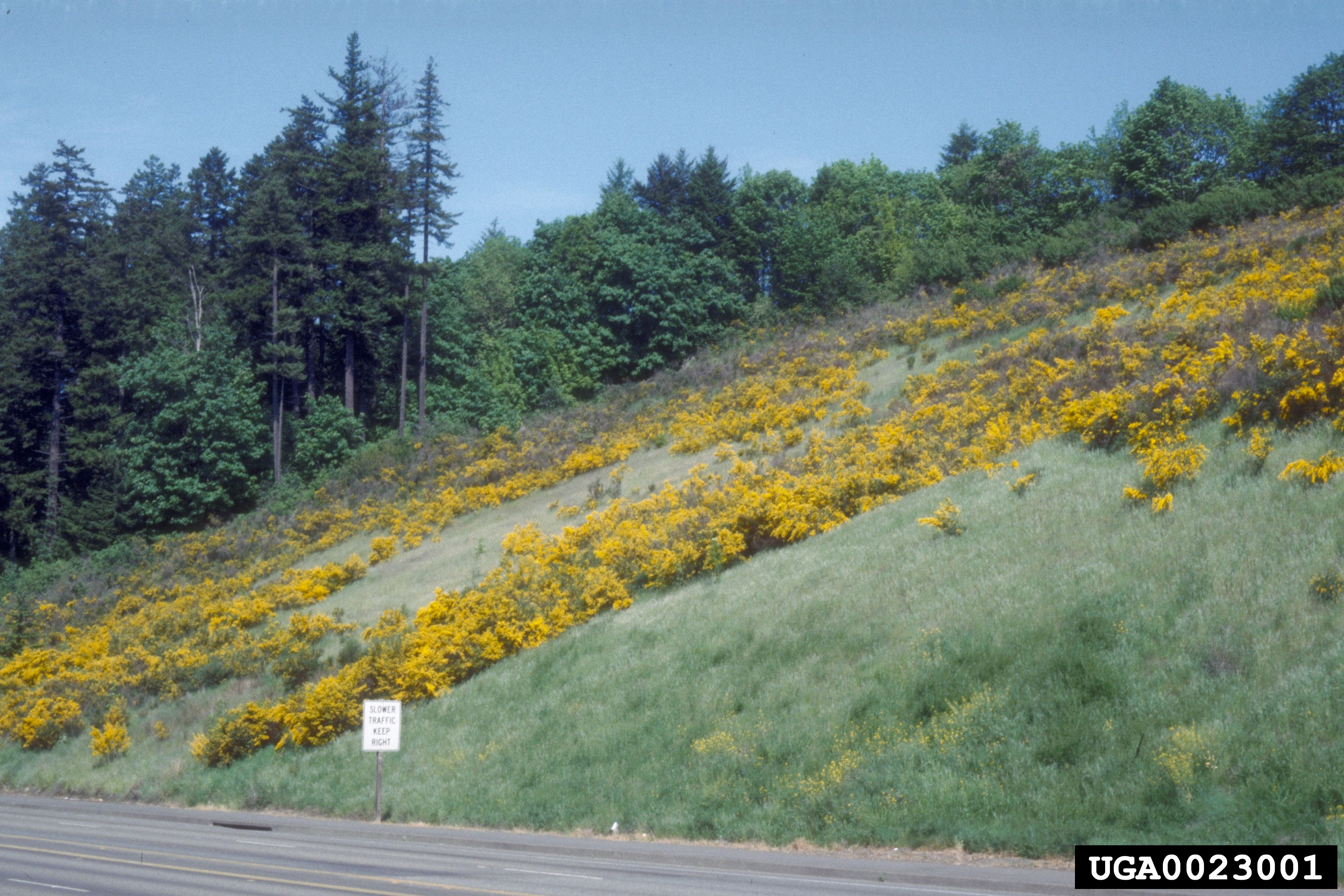
Broom is an invasive species in North America.

Cytisus scoparius has been introduced into several other countries and continents, outside of its native range, and is commonly classified as a noxious invasive species in western North America, mainly in British Columbia (including on Vancouver Island), California, Oregon, Washington (west of the Cascades), the Sierra Nevada range, fragmented areas of North America's eastern seaboard, as well as Australia (where it is highly invasive and an environmental weed),New Zealand, and in India. These shrubs are sometimes utilized for civic and public landscaping projects in the American west due to their hardiness, and will seasonally reseed themselves, growing in disturbed areas, and along utility and transportation rights-of-way. The prolific growth of the plants after timber harvest or wildfire events clearly inhibits reforestation efforts, the sprouts competing with native plant seedlings and trees. It is estimated that broom is responsible for US$47 million in lost timber production each year in the state of Oregon. In New Zealand, broom is estimated to cost the forestry industry NZ$90 million, and to cost farmers an additional NZ$10 million in losses.

Biological control for broom has been investigated since the mid-1980s, with a number of insect species being tested. Some of the tested invertebrates include the broom twig miner (Leucoptera spartifoliella), broom seed beetles (Bruchidius villosus), broom gall mites (Aceria genistae), sap-sucking broom psyllids (Arytainilla spartiophila), the Scotch broom seed weevil (Exapion fuscirostre) and recently, the broom leaf beetle (Gonioctena olivacea) and broom shoot moths (Agonopterix assimilella).

==== Eradication ====
The method used to remove broom is dependent on its prolific seed cycle. Care should be taken to avoid disturbing (aerating, loosening, etc.) the adjacent ground due to seed activation. The most effective method for eradication is cutting flowering plants just below the soil with loppers; late fall through winter (possibly to mid-spring) are preferred times to pull small plants. There are several methods, cutting, pulling, burning, herbicide or introducing chickens and goats. Drought areas respond well to cutting while the seed pods are young and still green. In cooler, wetter areas pulling is the preferred method, and hand-operated broom pullers are available. Low temperature fires, such as a grass fire, will increase seed germination and new sprouts may form on the burned stumps of mature broom. A spring fire followed by drought conditions will reduce seedling survival. Often new plants will grow from roots or seed, requiring repeated treatments.

== Cultivation ==
Cytisus scoparius is widely cultivated as an ornamental plant, with several cultivars selected for variation in flower colour, including "Moonlight" with deep yellow flowers, "Andreanus" and "Firefly" with dark orange-red flowers, and growth habit, including "Pendula" with pendulous branchlets.

== Uses ==
Broom contains scoparin, which is a diuretic. The plant also is used as a cathartic and as a cardiac stimulant, which is credited to the presence of sparteine. A decoction or infusion of broom can be used to treat dropsy due to its diuretic action. An ointment can be made from the flowers to treat gout. Oxysparteine, produced from the action of acid on the sparteine, is useful as a cardiac stimulant and has the advantage over digoxin that it does not accumulate in the body. A medicinal beer was brewed from this herb, called broom ale, as a remedy for dropsy.

== Culture ==
In Welsh mythology, Blodeuwedd is the name of a woman made from the flowers of broom, meadowsweet (Filipendula ulmaria) and the oak by Math fab Mathonwy and Gwydion to be the wife of Lleu Llaw Gyffes. Her story is part of the Fourth Branch of the Mabinogi, the tale of Math son of Mathonwy.

Broom was considered a sign of plenty when it bore many flowers. However a traditional rhyme from Sussex warns: "Sweep the house with blossomed broom in May/sweep the head of the household away." Broom was also used in a decorated bundle of broom at weddings in place of rosemary when that was scarce, and its strong smell was said to be able to tame wild horses and dogs.

In Italy, the shrub was burnt with the intent of stopping witches.

=== Royal symbols ===
The name of the House of Plantagenet, rulers of England in the Middle Ages, may have been derived from common broom, which was then known as planta genista in Latin. The plant was used as a heraldic badge by Geoffrey V of Anjou and five Plantagenet kings of England as a royal emblem. The broomscod, or seed-pod, was the personal emblem of Charles VI of France.

== See also ==
- Broom of the Cowdenknowes
