= Dôn =

Ancestor figure in Welsh legend

Dôn (Welsh pronunciation: [doːn]) is an ancestor figure in Welsh legend and literature. She is typically given as the mother of a group known as the "Children of Dôn", including Gwydion, Arianrhod, and Gilfaethwy, among many others. However, antiquarians of the early modern era generally considered Dôn a male figure.

== The House of Dôn ==
Mathonwy
Dôn	Math fab Mathonwy	Goewin
Gwydion	Gilfaethwy	Arianrhod	Gofannon	Amaethon
Dylan ail Don	Lleu Llaw Gyffes	Blodeuwedd

In addition, Bonedd yr Arwyr (the Gentry of the Heroes) gives an extended list of children, including Aidden, Cynan, Digant, Elawg, Elestron, Eunydd, Hedd, Hunawg, and Idwal.

== In astronomy ==
Llys Dôn (literally "The Court of Dôn") is the traditional Welsh name for the constellation Cassiopeia. At least two of Dôn's children also have astronomical associations: Caer Gwydion ("The Castle of Gwydion") is the traditional Welsh name for the Milky Way, and Caer Arianrhod ("The Castle of Arianrhod") being the constellation of Corona Borealis.

== Etymology & Proto-Indo-European Origins ==
Dôn has different etymological origins than the Irish Danu; while the latter is perhaps a water goddess (cf. the Danube river and the Vedic Danu), Dôn more likely comes from ghdhonos, meaning "the earth." In this sense, she can be seen as the Welsh version of "dheghom" from Proto-Indo-European mythology, the primordial Earth Goddess from which all other gods originate. It has been suggested that, as a result, the Children of Dôn would be cognate to the Greek Titans.

== See also ==
- The House of Llŷr
- Tuatha Dé Danann
- Danu (Irish goddess)
- Donn

== Bibliography ==
- d'Este, Sorita; Rankine, David (2007). The Isles of the Many Gods: An A-Z of the Pagan Gods & Goddesses of Ancient Britain worshipped during the First Millennium through to the Middle Ages. Avalonia.
