= Lleu Llaw Gyffes =

Warrior and magician of Welsh mythology

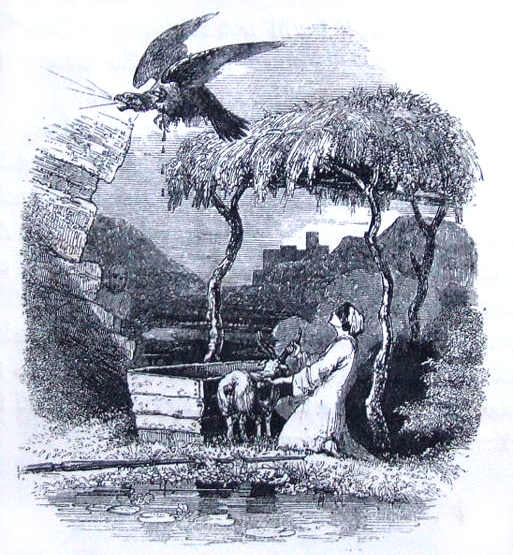
- Lleu rises in the form of an eagle. Image from The Mabinogion, Charlotte Guest, 1877.

In-universe information
- Family: Arianrhod (mother); Dylan ail Don (brother)
- Spouse: Blodeuwedd

Lleu Llaw Gyffes (Welsh pronunciation: [ˈɬɛɨ ˈɬau ˈɡəfɛs]), sometimes incorrectly spelled as Llew Llaw Gyffes, is a hero of Welsh mythology. He appears most prominently in the Fourth Branch of the Mabinogi, the tale of Math fab Mathonwy, which tells the tale of his birth, his marriage, his death, his resurrection and his accession to the throne of Gwynedd. He is a warrior and magician, invariably associated with his uncle Gwydion.

His name appears to be the Welsh equivalent of the Irish Lugh and the Gaulish Lugus. It has been suggested that Lleu, like Pryderi, is related to the divine son figure of Mabon ap Modron.

== Name ==
The name Lleu is derived from Proto-Celtic *Lugus, the exact meaning (and etymology) of which is still a matter of scholarly debate.

== Role in Welsh tradition ==
The story of Lleu and the tynghedau of Arianrhod and then of Lleu and Blodeuwedd form respectively the second and third part of the Mabinogi of Math fab Mathonwy.

=== Birth ===
Gilfaethwy, nephew to the Venedotian king, Math fab Mathonwy, falls in love with his uncle's virgin foot-holder, Goewin. His brother Gwydion conspires to start a war between the north and the south, so as give the brothers the opportunity to rape Goewin while Math is distracted by the ensuing war. To this end, Gwydion steals a number of otherworldly pigs from the Demetian king, Pryderi, leading to an invasion of Gwynedd.

Pryderi and his men march north and fight a battle between Maenor Bennardd and Maenor Coed Alun, but are forced to retreat. He is pursued to Nant Call, where more of his men are slaughtered, and then to Dol Benmaen, where he suffers a third defeat. To avoid further bloodshed, it is agreed that the outcome of the battle should be decided by single combat between Gwydion and Pryderi. The two contenders meet at a place called Y Velen Rhyd in Ardudwy, and "because of strength and valour and magic and enchantment", Gwydion triumphs and Pryderi is killed. The men of Dyfed retreat to their own land, lamenting over the death of their lord.

When Math hears of the assault on Goewin, he turns his nephews into a series of mated pairs of animals: Gwydion becomes a stag for a year, then a sow and finally a wolf. Gilfaethwy becomes a hind deer, a boar and a she-wolf. Each year they produce an offspring which is sent to Math: Hyddwn, Hychddwn and Bleiddwn. After three years, Math releases his nephews from their punishment and begins the search for a new foot-holder. Gwydion suggests his sister Arianrhod, who is magically tested for virginity by Math. During the test, she gives birth to a "sturdy boy with thick yellow hair" whom Math names Dylan and who takes on the nature of the seas until his death at his uncle Gofannon's hands.

Ashamed, Arianrhod runs to the door, but on her way out something small drops from her, which Gwydion wraps up and places in a chest at the foot of his bed. Some time later, he hears screams from within the chest, and opens it to discover a second baby boy.

=== Lleu and the tynghedau of Arianrhod ===
Some years later, Gwydion accompanies the boy to Caer Arianrhod, and presents him to his mother. The furious Arianrhod, shamed by this reminder of her loss of virginity, places a tynged on the boy: that only she could give him a name. Gwydion, however, tricks his sister by disguising himself and the boy as cobblers and luring Arianrhod into going to them in person in order to have some shoes made for her. The boy uses an unspecified missile to strike a wren "between the tendon and the bone of its leg", causing Arianrhod to make the remark "it is with a skillful hand that the fair-haired one has hit it". At that Gwydion reveals himself, saying Lleu Llaw Gyffes; "'the fair-haired one with the skillful hand' is his name now". Furious at this trickery, Arianrhod places another tynged on Lleu: he shall receive arms from no one but Arianrhod herself. Gwydion tricks his sister once again, and she unwittingly arms Lleu herself, leading to her placing a third tynged on him: that he shall never have a human wife.

So as to counteract Arianrhod's curse, Math and Gwydion:

[take] the flowers of the oak, and the flowers of the broom, and the flowers of the meadowsweet, and from those they conjured up the fairest and most beautiful maiden anyone had ever seen. And they baptized her in the way that they did at that time, and named her Blodeuwedd.

=== Lleu and Blodeuwedd ===
Blodeuwedd has an affair with Gronw Pebr, the lord of Penllyn, and the two conspire to murder Lleu. Blodeuwedd tricks Lleu into revealing how he may be killed, since he cannot be killed during the day or night, nor indoors or outdoors, neither riding nor walking, not clothed and not naked, nor by any weapon lawfully made. He reveals to her that he can only be killed at dusk, wrapped in a net with one foot on a cauldron and one on a goat and with a spear forged for a year during the hours when everyone is at mass. With this information she arranges his death.

Struck by the spear thrown by Gronw's hand, Lleu transforms into an eagle and flies away. Gwydion tracks him down and finds him perched high on an oak. Through the singing of englynion, the englynion Gwydion, he lures him down from the oak tree and switches him back to his human form. Gwydion and Math nurse Lleu back to health before reclaiming his lands from Gronw and Blodeuwedd. In the face-off between Lleu and Gronw, Gronw asks if he may place a large stone between himself and Lleu's spear. Lleu allows him to do so, then throws his spear, which pierces both the stone and Gronw, killing him. Gwydion corners Blodeuwedd and turns her into an owl. The tale ends with Lleu acceding to the throne of Gwynedd.

=== Other appearances ===
In the 10th century, Old Welsh "Harleian" genealogies (Harley MS 3859), mention is made of Lou Hen ("Lou the old") map Guidgen, who most scholars identify with Lleu and Gwydion (who is implied to be Lleu's father in the Mabinogi of Math, though this relationship is not explicitly stated). In the genealogy they are made direct descendants Caratauc son of Cinbelin son of Teuhant (recte Tehuant), who are to be identified with the historical Catuvellaunian leaders Caratacus, Cunobeline and Tasciovanus.

A number of references to Lleu can be found in early Welsh poetry. According to the Book of Taliesin, he fought alongside Gwydion at the Battle of the Trees, in which he assisted his uncle in enchanting the trees to rise up in battle against Arawn, king of Annwn. The poem Prif Gyuarch Taliessin asks "Lleu and Gwydion / Will they perform magics?", while in the same corpus, The poem Kadeir Taliesin refers to the "golden pipes of Lleu".

Lleu's death is alluded to a number of times in medieval texts. In the Stanzas of the Graves, it is claimed that Lleu's grave lies "under the protection of the sea". A variant of the last two lines of the stanza is found in the Beddau in Peniarth 98: "before his doom came, he was a man who invited attack." The poem Kateir Kerrituen ("Song of Cerridwen") states that he fell at Arllechwedd, whilst also giving him a son, Minawg fab Lleu. A variant translation suggests conversely that it was Minawg who was killed, at the "slope of Lleu".

The Triads of the Horses name his horse as Melyngan Mangre ("Yellow-white Stud-horse"), one of the three bestowed horses, and the Hergest Triads refer to Lleu himself as one of the three "Red Ravagers of the Island of Britain" as well as one of the three "Golden Shoemakers". A reference to Lleu is also made in the "Dialogue of Taliesin and Ugnach", a dialogue-poem found in the Black Book of Carmarthen. Within the narrative, the character of Taliesin states:

When I return from Caer Seon
From contending with Jews
I will come to the city of Lleu and Gwydion.

== See also ==
- Hiranyakashipu, a Hindu figure with similar conditional invulnerability.

== Bibliography ==
- Bromwich, Rachel (2006). Trioedd Ynys Prydein: The Triads of the Island of Britain. University Of Wales Press. ISBN 978-0-7083-1386-2.
- Gruffydd, William John. Math vab Mathonwy, University of Wales Press, 1928.
- Haycock, Marged, ed. and tr. (2007). Legendary Poems from the Book of Taliesin. CMCS Publications. Aberystwyth. ISBN 978-0-9527478-9-5.
- Ifans, Dafydd & Rhiannon, Y Mabinogion (Gomer 1980) ISBN 978-1-85902-260-3
- Koch, John (ed.). Celtic Culture: a historical encyclopedia. ABC-CLIO, 2006, p. 1165-1166.
- Schrijver, Peter. Studies in British Celtic Historical Phonology. Amsterdam: Rodopi, 1995.
