= Lena broom =

Species of legume

Cytisus 'Lena'
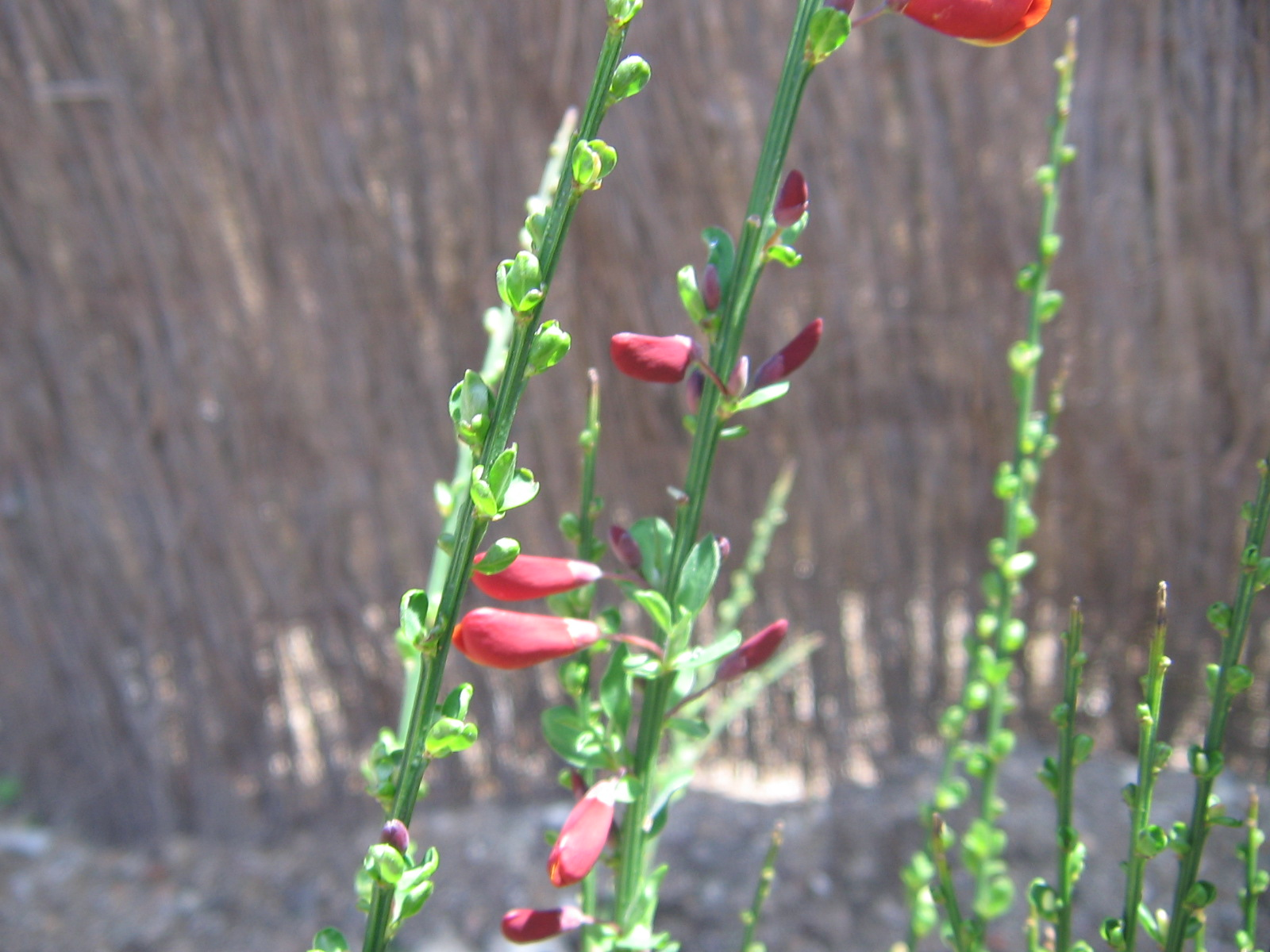
- Hybrid parentage: Cytisus scoparius × Cytisus dallimorei
- Breeder: Herr Lena
- Origin: German

Cytisus 'Lena' (or Broom 'Lena') is a hybrid broom of two species of Cytisus, Cytisus scoparius × Cytisus dallimorei, and is known as 'Lena' after the German hybridizer, Herr Lena. He is credited with a handful of other classic broom cultivars. It is a small deciduous shrub with slender green shoots and small trifoliate leaves. It has fragrant flowers of brown-red edged with gold, or deep crimson with a light yellow keel.

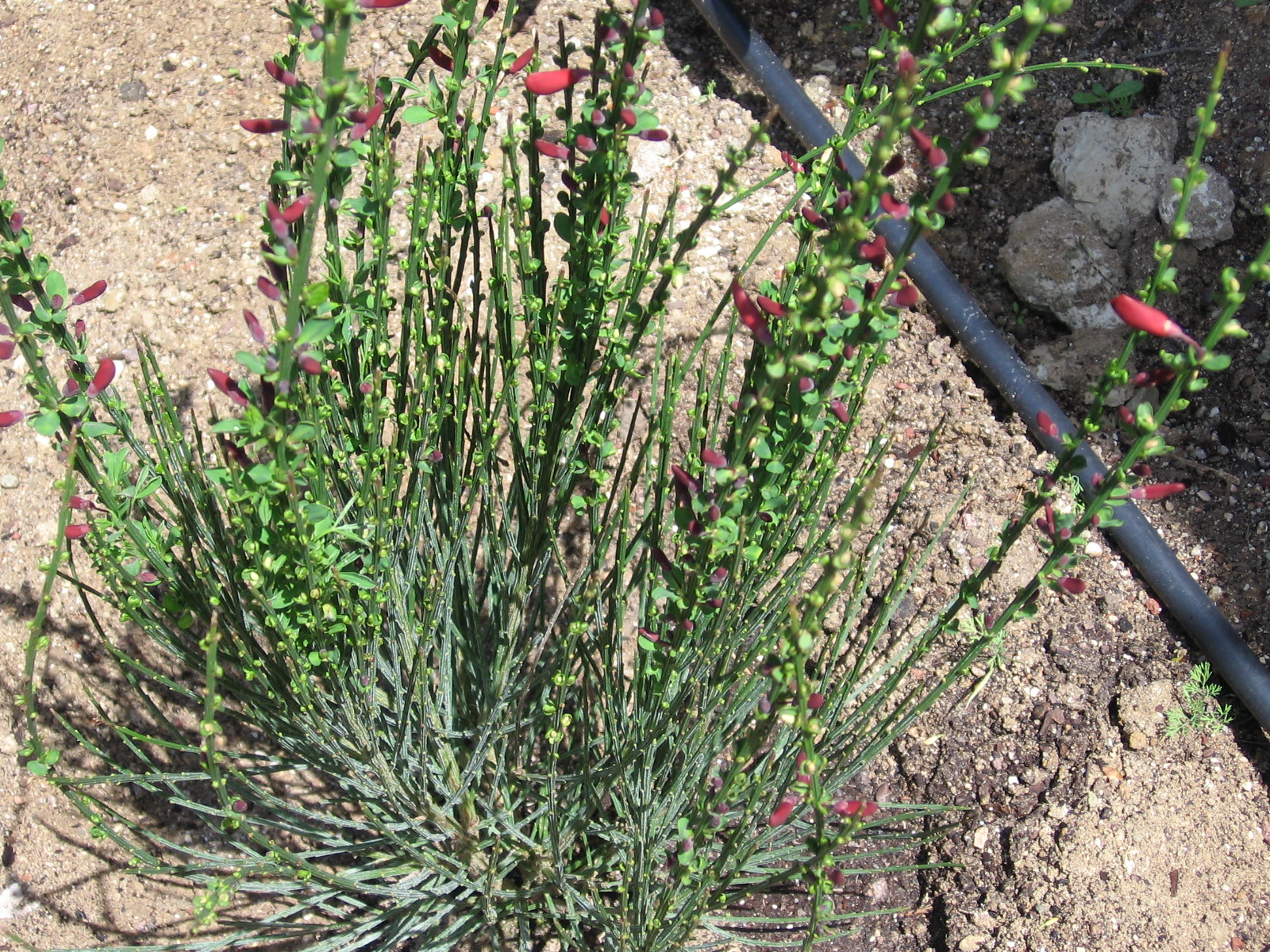

In 1993, Cytisus 'Lena' was a recipient of the Award of Garden Merit from the Royal Horticultural Society. It can fairly easily be mistaken for its wild parent Cytisus scoparius which is an invasive pest in many parts of the West Coast of the United States and Canada. 'Lena' is a well-behaved (meaning compact,) desirable shrub. It flowers between Spring and early Summer, likes full sun and is very hardy. It just needs pruning occasionally to keep in shape. As a legume, this shrub can fix nitrogen in the soil through a symbiotic relationship with Rhizobium bacteria. It is hardy to USDA zones 5-8.

Known as 'Lena Broom', Lena's broom, Cytisus 'lena', Cytisus ×lena, & Lena Cytisus.
