= Englynion Gwydion =

Mediaeval work of Welsh-language poetry

Englynion Gwydion is the name sometimes used to refer to a series of three englyn (Welsh plural englynion) composed by Gwydion to call to him the wounded Lleu Llaw Gyffes after Lleu was struck by a poisoned spear by Gronw Pebr which ultimately turns him into an eagle. It appears in the fourth branch of the Mabinogi, the tale of Math fab Mathonwy.

	Middle Welsh (modern rendering)	Modern Welsh	English translation
Stanza 1	Dar a dyf y rwng deu lenn, Gorduwrych awyr a glenn. Ony dywedaf i eu, O ulodeu Lleu ban yw hynn.	Derwen a dyf rhwng dau lyn yn cysgodi'n dawel awyr a glyn oni ddywedaf i gelwydd o flodau Lleu y mae hyn.	Oak that grows between two lakes; Darkening gently sky and glen Unless I tell a lie, From the flowers of Lleu are these.
Stanza 2	Dar a dyf yn ard uaes, Nis gwlych glaw, mwy tawd nawes. Ugein angerd a borthes. Yn y blaen, Lleu Llaw Gyffes.	Derwen a dyf mewn maes uchel nis gwlych glaw, nis tawdd gwres cynhaliodd ugain dawn ar ei brig Lleu Llaw Gyffes.	Oak that grows in upland ground, Rain wets it not, heat burns it not It contained twenty gifts It bears in its branches Lleu of the Skilfull Hand.
Stanza 3	Dar a dyf dan anwaeret, Mirein modur ymywet. Ony dywedaf i [eu] Ef dydau Lleu y'm arfet.	Derwen a dyf dan lechwedd noddfa tywysog hardd oni ddywedaf i gelwydd fe ddaw Lleu i'm harffed.	Oak that grows beneath the slope Shelter of a fair prince Unless I tell a lie Lleu will come to my lap.
