= Amaethon =

Welsh mythological being

In Welsh mythology, Amaethon (Welsh: Amaethon fab Dôn (Welsh pronunciation: [aˈmaːɨθɔn])) was the son of Dôn, and brother to Arianrhod, Penarddun, Gilfaethwy, Gofannon, Gwydion, and Nudd. His name means "great labourer" or "great ploughman" and he is cited in Peniarth MS.98b as being responsible for the Cad Goddeu, or "Battle of Trees" against the lord of the otherworld, Arawn.

== Sources ==
The principal reference to Amaethon appears in the medieval Welsh prose tale Culhwch and Olwen, where he was the only man who could till a certain field, one of the impossible tasks Culhwch had been set before he could win Olwen's hand.

In the seventeenth-century Welsh poem Cad Goddau in Peniarth MS.98b (not to be confused with the poem of the same name attributed to Taliesin), a possible reference is made to Amathaon, where it is recorded that he steals a dog, lapwing and roebuck from Arawn, king of Annwn (the otherworld), leading to a battle against Arawn. Gwydion used his magic staff to turn trees into warriors who helped the children of Dôn win.

In one of the triads invented by Iolo Morganwg, he teaches magic to his brother Gwydion (this is not accepted as a genuine medieval triad by modern scholars).

== Etymology ==
His name is derived from Proto-Celtic *Ambaxtonos meaning 'great follower, servant or ploughman', an augmentative form of ambactos (ultimately from *ambhi-ag-to-).

== Bibliography ==
- Ellis, Peter Berresford, Dictionary of Celtic Mythology(Oxford Paperback Reference), Oxford University Press, (1994): ISBN 0-19-508961-8
- MacKillop, James. Dictionary of Celtic Mythology. Oxford: Oxford University Press, 1998. ISBN 0-19-280120-1.
- Wood, Juliette, The Celts: Life, Myth, and Art, Thorsons Publishers (2002): ISBN 0-00-764059-5
