= Englynion y Beddau =

Middle Welsh verse

- "Stanzas of the Graves"
- Also known as: Beddau Milwyr Ynys Prydain ("The graves of the warriors of the Island of Britain")
- Language: Middle Welsh
- Manuscript(s): (1) Black Book of Carmarthen (MS Peniarth 1); (2) Red Book of Hergest and transcripts; (3) MS Peniarth 98B
- Genre: heroic and elegiac verse, place-name lore
- Verse form: englyn, especially englyn milwr and englyn penfyr
- Subject: the sites of the graves where the heroes of early Welsh tradition are supposed to lie
- Personages: include King Arthur, Bedwyr, Beid(d)awg Rudd, Beli ap Benlli, Bradwen, Cynddylan, Cynddylig son of Corcnud, Cynon ap Clydno, Dehewaint, Dylan Eil Ton, Eiddew and Eidal sons of Meigen, Eilinwy, Garwen daughter of Hennin, Gwalchmai, Gwên son of Llywarch, Gwgawn Red-Sword, Gwrtheyrn Gwrthenau, Gwythur son of Greidawl, Llemenig, Lleu, March (probably Mark of Cornwall), Meigen son of Rhun, Owain, Pryderi, Rhydderch Hael, Seithenin, Talan, etc.

The Englynion y Beddau (English: The Stanzas or Verses of the Graves) is a Middle Welsh verse catalogue listing the resting places (beddau) of legendary heroes. It consists of a series of englynion, or short stanzas, and survives in a number of manuscripts. The collection is thought to be considerably older than its earliest manuscript, the 13th-century Black Book of Carmarthen, and provides an important early glimpse at medieval Welsh heroic tradition and topographical folklore.

== Transmission ==
The stanzas, or more specifically, englynion, are transmitted in four classes of medieval Welsh manuscripts and later transcripts. The earliest, best known and most reliable version of the text is the collection of 73 englynion preserved in the Black Book of Carmarthen. The first 69 stanzas were copied in the first quarter of the 13th century, while the last four were added at a later stage, probably in the same century. Five further englynion survive as part of the poetic cycles of Heledd and Llywarch Hen in the Red Book of Hergest and two transcripts, supposedly from the White Book of Rhydderch, made in the decades on both sides of 1600: BL, Additional MS 31055 and Peniarth MS 111. The third significant group is represented by Dr John Davies' copy in NLW Peniarth 98(B) and a number of manuscripts which appear to go back to a 16th-century manuscript, now lost. It contains 18 stanzas in corrupt form, some of which are alternative versions of the englynion in the Black Book of Carmarthen. Finally, there is a single englyn milwr preserved in Wrexham MS 1 and still later manuscripts.

Although the earliest extant manuscript dates to the 13th century, much of the material is thought to be considerably earlier. According to Thomas Jones, the language, style and metre of the verses suggests a date of composition somewhere in the 9th or 10th century. Likewise, Jenny Rowlands has dated some of the stanzas contained in the Black Book text to the 9th century.

== Form and structure ==
The core of the text in the Black Book of Carmarthen is made up by the englynion which employ either of two basic opening formulas. The first of these formulas is Y bedd "The grave" (33x), or variants thereof, such as Y beddau (6x) and (Y) tri bedd (2x). The other takes the form of a question, Pieu y bedd…? "Whose is the grave…?" (18x), usually followed by an answer identifying the name of the hero who lies in the grave. A further 13 stanzas deviate from this pattern and they may be regarded as additions which derive from other sources, though some are part of a series which contains one of these set formulas. In the standard edition of the work by Thomas Jones, they are given as stanzas 7 (not an englyn), 14-15 (on Owain and Cynddylan), 19 (part of 17-19, on Meigen son of Rhun), 30 (part of 28-30, on graves at a site called Gwanas), 37-38 (on Beid(d)awg Rudd), 42-43 (presumably uttered by the legendary Taliesin), 41 (on Cynddylig son of Corcnud), 47 (part of 46-7, on Eiddew and Eidal, sons of Meigen), 62 (on Bradwen) and 64.

A single englyn may describe up to three different heroes. Place-names are often absent and when described, the grave-sites may assume a variety of locations - in mountainous, hilly or flat landscapes, near waterways or churches, and even in the sea. The verses occasionally refer to the physical condition of the graves, such as wetness and growth of moss.

== Themes and contents ==
With the exception of the four women mentioned in stanza 70, the names of the dead belong to male heroes of Welsh legend (rather than history). They receive high praise for the virile strength and prowess they have shown in battle, such as Dehewaint, a "strong pillar of warriors". Although the dominant tone remains one of heroic celebration, the eulogies are also touched with a hint of sadness for the inevitability of death, as expressed in the gnomic statement that "each one's death comes at the fated time" (stanza 64).

Like the Trioedd Ynys Prydein or Welsh Triads, the work is valuable for offering numerous glimpses of Welsh heroic tradition. These are embedded in snippets of topographic folklore, which "[testify] to the close association between heroes and places in early Welsh literature".

The work is famous for containing an early allusion to King Arthur, whose grave is said to be one of the mysteries of the world (anoeth byd). References or possible allusions to Bedwyr, Gwalchmai and the Battle of Camlann also testify to some absorption of Arthurian tradition in the text, though the work has little in common with the earliest Welsh Arthurian tale, Culhwch ac Olwen.

There are also references to characters known from the Middle Welsh prose tales of the Mabinogi. The Dylan of stanza 4, whose grave is said to be near the church of St Beuno (i.e. at Clynnog Fawr), appears to be the Dylan Eil Ton ("son of Wave") who occurs in the Fourth Branch. Another Mabinogi character is Pryderi, of whom the Fourth Branch tells that he was slain and buried at Maen Tyriawg, above the Felenrhyd. Stanza 7 locates his grave at the confluence of the Gwenoli, which is where the stream meets the Felenrhyd. The relation between the grave of Lleu Llaw Gyffes "under cover of the sea, / where his disgrace was, / a man who spared no one" (stanza 35) and the account of his death in the Fourth Branch is uncertain and it may be that the englyn alludes to a somewhat different story.

== See also ==
- Broccán the Pious, "On the Graves of Leinster Men" (10th-century Irish poem)
- Ernest Rhys, early translation of the Englynion y Beddau into English.
- Versos dos Túmulos, translation of the Englynion y Beddau into Brazilian Portuguese.
