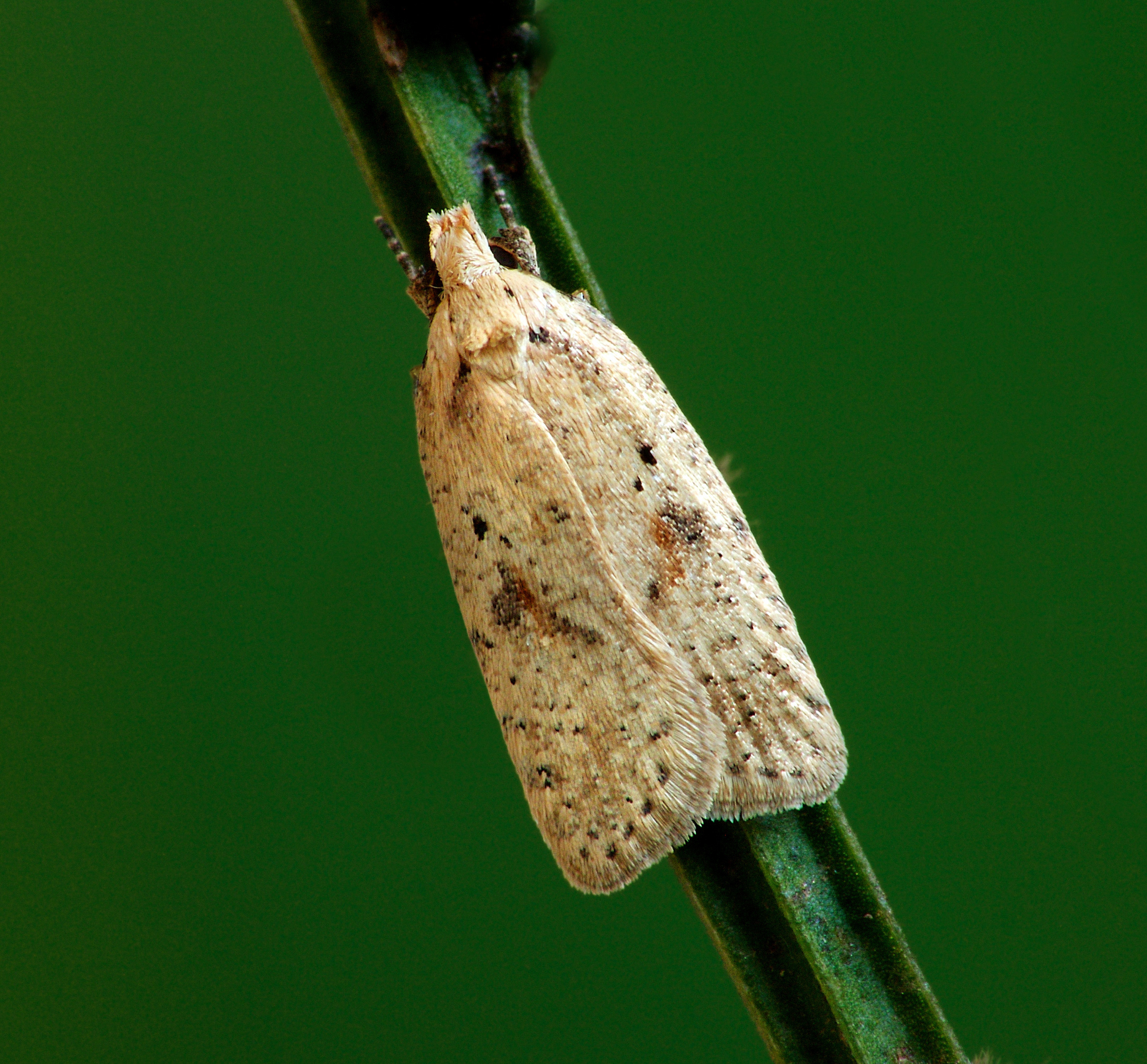

Scientific classification
- Kingdom: Animalia
- Phylum: Arthropoda
- Clade: Pancrustacea
- Class: Insecta
- Order: Lepidoptera
- Family: Depressariidae
- Genus: Agonopterix
- Species: A. assimilella

Binomial name
- Agonopterix assimilella (Treitschke, 1832)

Synonyms
- Haemylis assimilella Treitschke, 1832; Depressaria irrorella Stephens, 1834

= Agonopterix assimilella =

Species of moth

Agonopterix assimilella is a moth of the family Depressariidae. It is found in most of Europe.

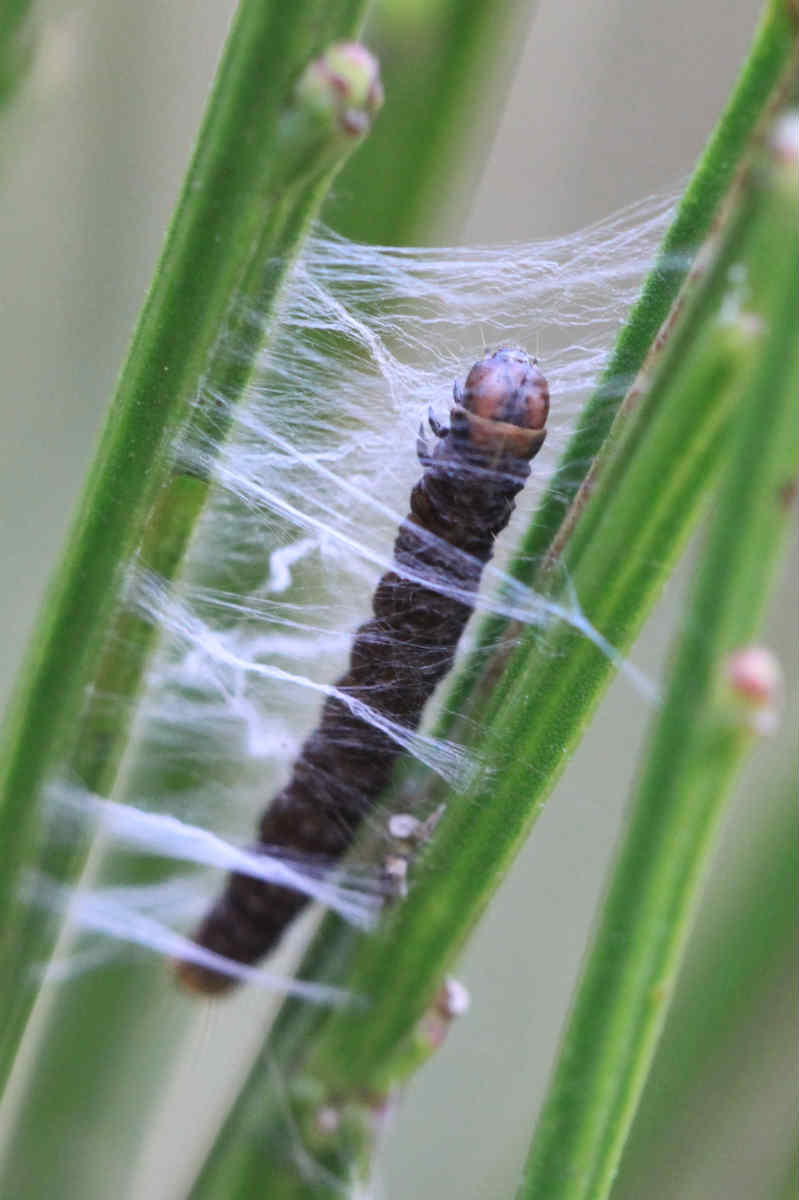
A sprig of broom with stems united by the web of a larva

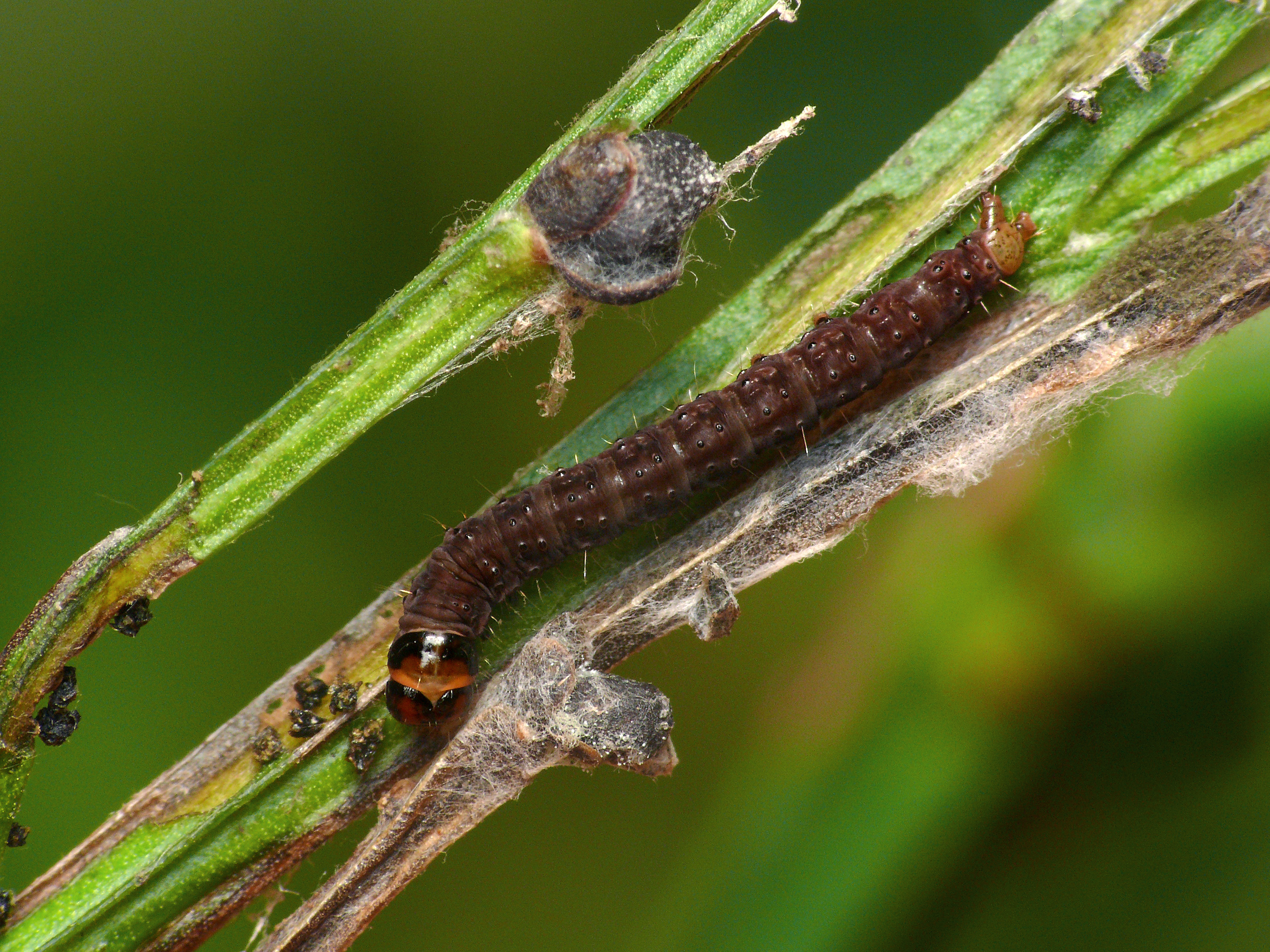
Larva

The wingspan is 15–21 mm. The forewings are whitish-ochreous, often mixed with deeper ochreous or brownish, strewn with dots of blackish scales; first discal stigma blackish, second whitish, but usually obsolete, sometimes preceded by a reddish mark, across which lies often an oblique dark fuscous suffusion. Hindwings are ochreous-grey-whitish. The larva is brown; dots black; head and plate of 2 black.

Adults are on wing from April to June.

The larvae feed on Cytisus scoparius. Larvae can be found from October to February. The species overwinters in the larval stage within the stem.

== Biocontrol agent in New Zealand ==
A. assimilella has been introduced to New Zealand to attempt to control the invasive to New Zealand plant Cytisus scoparius. As at 2021 the success of the introduction of this species to New Zealand was uncertain.
