= Hyddwn =

In Welsh Mythology, Hyddwn (from the Welsh hydd, "Stag") appears in the fourth of the Four Branches of the Mabinogi and is one of the three sons of Gwydion and Gilfaethwy. As punishment for the rape of Goewin, Math banished his nephews, turning them into a breeding pair of deer for a year, then pigs, and finally wolves. They had three children over the three years: Hyddwn, Hychddwn, and Bleiddwn. Hyddwn is the offspring of the deer pairing. Math took him and transformed him into a human being, baptising him Hyddwn ("Stag-man").
