= Dylan ail Don =

Welsh mythological figure

Dylan ail Don (Middle Welsh pronunciation [ˈdəlan ˈail ˈdɔn]) is a character in the fourth branch of the Mabinogi, "Math fab Mathonwy".

In Wales, Dylan is one of the most popular traditional Welsh names for boys.

== Biography ==
In Math fab Mathonwy it is told that Dylan's great uncle Math would die if he did not keep his feet in the lap of a virgin when not at war. Math's original foot-holder, Goewin, is raped by Gilfaethwy who is punished severely when Math returns, turning Gilfaethwy and Gwydion into a series of mated pairs of animals. Math then marries Goewin to alleviate her shame, but must find a new virgin to hold his feet. Gwydion suggests his sister, Arianrhod. Math magically tests Arianrhod to confirm that she is a virgin, at which point she gives birth to twin sons.

=== Dylan's baptism ===
One of the sons, Lleu Llaw Gyffes, is borne away by Gwydion as a "lump of flesh" and concealed in a chest until maturity, but the other, a sturdy blonde boy, was immediately forsaken by his mother yet was acknowledged by his great uncle Math and given the name Dylan. As soon as Dylan comes in contact with his baptismal waters, he plunges into the sea and takes on characteristics of a sea creature, moving through the seawater as perfectly as any fish:

'So they had the boy baptised, and as they baptised him he plunged into the sea. And immediately when he was in the sea, he took its nature, and swam as well as the best fish that was therein. And for that reason was he called Dylan, the son of the Wave'

=== Dylan's death ===
Dylan is accidentally killed by his uncle Gofannon in the end.

'And the blow whereby he came to his death, was struck by his uncle Gofannon. The third fatal blow was it called'.

== Genealogy ==
In the Mabinogion, Dylan's mother, Arianrhod, is the daughter of Dôn and the sister of Gwydion and Gilfaethwy. Her Uncle, Math ap Mathonwy, is the King of Gwynedd, and during the course of the story, Arianrhod gives birth to her two sons; Dylan ail Don and Lleu Llaw Gyffes through magical means.

In the Welsh Triads, we are given a context for an actual Arianrhod who appears as the daughter of Beli Mawr and the sister of Caswallawn (the historical Cassivellaunus). Whether this reference is the result of the merging of a myth and history is unclear. It is possible that a later historic Arianrhod has become identified and merged with an earlier legendary/mythological Arianrhod.

== Literary reference ==
Dylan is the subject of a eulogy entitled Marwnad Dylan Ail Don attributed to the bard Taliesin:

One God Supreme, divine, the wisest, the greatest his habitation,
when he came to the field, who charmed him in the hand of the extremely liberal.
Or sooner than he, who was on peace on the nature of a turn.
An opposing groom, poison made, a wrathful deed,
Piercing Dylan a mischievous shore, violence freely flowing
Wave of Iwerdon, and wave of Manau, and wave of the North,
And wave of Prydain, hosts comely in fours.
I will adore the Father God, the regulator of the country, without refusing.
Creator in Heaven, may he admit us into merry.

== Etymology ==
The etymology of the name Dylan is somewhat complex. In Welsh, there is a bound item dylanw- which appears in dylanwad ‘influence,’ dylanwadol ‘influential’ and dylanwadu ‘to influence’. This element dylanw- appears itself to be a compound of the prefix dy- and the noun llanw ‘tidal flow’. The prefix dy- appears in numerous words in Welsh and is reconstructed in Proto-Celtic as *dī- with the meaning of ‘off, away’. The item llanw is reconstructed in Proto-Celtic as *φlanwo- ‘flood, filling.’ This *φlanwo- may plausibly have had a reduced form *φlanu- ‘flood.’ This etymology is echoed in the following Gaelic (Irish) words:

- [tuinne] nf. in : gob na tuinne, the water edge
- [tòn] nf. g. tòine; d. tòin; pl.+an, the fundament
- [tonn] nm. g.v. tuinn; pl.+an and tuinn, wave, surge, billow
