= Ieuan ap Rhydderch ab Ieuan Llwyd =

Ieuan ap Rhydderch ab Ieuan Llwyd (fl. 1410–1440) was a Welsh bard.

He was a native of Glyn Aeron, Ceredigion. His father resided at Parc Rhydderch, is described as lord of Genau'r Glyn and Tregaron in the same county, and was an ancestor to the Pryse family of Gogerddan, and in the female line to the Wynnes of Peniarth.

Ieuan ap Rhydderch appears to have been a collector of Welsh manuscripts, for a valuable volume of Welsh medieval romances, known after him as the White Book of Rhydderch, once belonged to him, and was later preserved in the Hengwrt Library. Another volume in the same collection, Llawysgrif Hendregadredd (National Library of Wales MS 6680B, The Hendregadredd Manuscript), is one of the two major sources for the Poetry of the Princes (11th–13th centuries, and also contains two poems by Dafydd ap Gwilym, possibly in that poet's own handwriting; this manuscript was also probably in Rhydderch's collection during the fourteenth century, it having have functioned from the time of his grandfather, Ieuan Llwyd ab Ieuan ap Gruffudd Foel, as a kind of house-book, akin to the Irish 'duanaire'.

Ieuan's own poetry is chiefly of a religious character, like his poems to the Virgin Mary and to Saint David, which are published in the Iolo Manuscripts. Three extracts from his works, as specimens of curious metres, are also printed in 'Cyfrinach y Beirdd'. Many other of his poems are preserved in the British Library. Some are also found in the Hengwrt Manuscripts. Ieuan was also the writer of a poem in English.
