= Hychddwn =

Hychddwn Hir ("Dark-Red Pig, the Tall" from the Welsh hwch, "Swine" and hir, "Long") appears in the fourth of the Four Branches of the Mabinogi and is one of the sons of Gwydion and Gilfaethwy, brothers who were transformed into pigs as punishment for rape. They had two other sons: Hyddwn and Bleiddwn. Math took him and transformed him into a human being, baptising him Hychddwn Hir ("Dark-Red Pig-man").
