= Gwydion =

Character from Welsh mythology

Gwydion fab Dôn
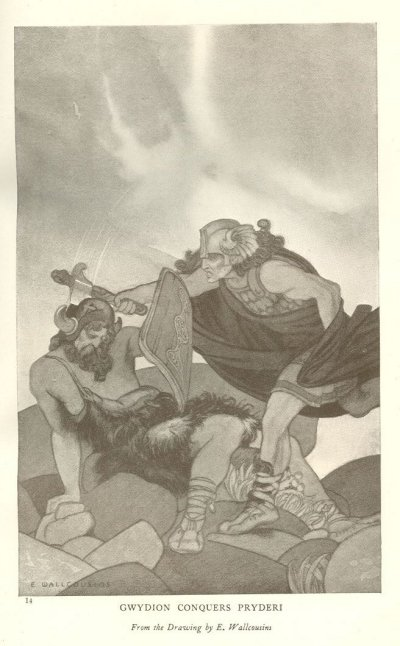
- Gwydion slays Pryderi in single combat. Image by E. Wallcousins.

Gwydion fab Dôn (Welsh pronunciation: [ˈɡwɨ̞djɔn vaːb ˈdoːn]) is a magician in Welsh mythology, appearing most prominently in the Fourth Branch of the Mabinogi, which focuses largely on his relationship with his young nephew, Lleu Llaw Gyffes. He also appears prominently in the Welsh Triads, the Book of Taliesin and the Stanzas of the Graves.

The name Gwydion may be interpreted as "Born of Trees".

== Mythological exploits ==
=== War with the South ===
Gilfaethwy, nephew to the Venedotian king, Math fab Mathonwy, becomes obsessed with his uncle's virgin foot-holder, Goewin. His brother Gwydion conspires to start a war between the north and the south. To this end, Gwydion employs his magic powers to steal a number of otherworldly pigs from the Demetian king, Pryderi, who retaliates by marching on Gwynedd. During the war, while Math is distracted, the brothers return home and Gilfaethwy rapes Goewin.

Pryderi and his men march north and fight a battle between Maenor Bennardd and Maenor Coed Alun, but are forced to retreat. He is pursued to Nant Call, where more of his men are slaughtered, and then to Dol Benmaen, where he suffers a third defeat. To avoid further bloodshed, it is agreed that the outcome of the battle should be decided by single combat between Gwydion and Pryderi. The two contenders meet at a place called Y Velen Rhyd in Ardudwy, and "because of strength and valour and magic and enchantment", Gwydion triumphs and Pryderi is killed. The men of Dyfed retreat back to their own land, lamenting over the death of their lord.

=== Birth of Lleu ===
When Math hears of the assault on Goewin, he turns his nephews into a series of mated pairs of animals: Gwydion becomes a stag for a year, then a sow and finally a wolf. Gilfaethwy becomes a hind, a wild boar and a she-wolf. Each year they produce an offspring which is sent to Math: Hyddwn, Hychddwn and Bleiddwn. After three years, Math releases his nephews from their punishment and begins the search for a new foot-holder. Gwydion suggests his sister Arianrhod, who is magically tested for virginity by Math. During the test, she gives birth to a "sturdy boy with thick yellow hair" whom Math names Dylan and who takes on the nature of the seas until his death at his uncle Gofannon's hands.

Ashamed, Arianrhod runs to the door, but on her way out something small drops from her, which Gwydion wraps up and places in a chest at the foot of his bed. Some time later, he hears screams from within the chest, and opens it to discover a baby boy. Some scholars have suggested that in an earlier form of the Fourth Branch, Gwydion was the father of Arianrhod's sons.

=== The tynghedau of Arianrhod ===
Some years later, Gwydion accompanies the boy to Caer Arianrhod, and presents him to his mother. The furious Arianrhod, shamed by this reminder of her loss of virginity, places a tynged on the boy: that only she could give him a name. Gwydion however tricks his sister by disguising himself and the boy as cobblers and luring Arianrhod into going to them in person in order to have some shoes made for her. The boy throws a stone and strikes a wren "between the tendon and the bone of its leg", causing Arianrhod to make the remark "it is with a skillful hand that the fair-haired one has hit it". At that Gwydion reveals himself, saying Lleu Llaw Gyffes, "the fair-haired one with the skillful hand", is his name now. Furious at this trickery, Arianrhod places another tynged on Lleu: he shall receive arms from no one but Arianrhod herself. Gwydion tricks his sister once again, and she unwittingly arms Lleu herself, leading to her placing a third tynged on him: that he shall never have a human wife.

So as to counteract Arianrhod's curse, Math and Gwydion:

[take] the flowers of the oak, and the flowers of the broom, and the flowers of the meadowsweet, and from those they conjured up the fairest and most beautiful maiden anyone had ever seen. And they baptized her in the way that they did at that time, and named her Blodeuwedd.

=== Lleu's death and resurrection ===
Blodeuwedd has an affair with Gronw Pebr, the lord of Penllyn, and the two conspire to murder Lleu. Blodeuwedd tricks Lleu into revealing how he may be killed, since he can not be killed during the day or night, nor indoors or outdoors, neither riding nor walking, not clothed and not naked, nor by any weapon lawfully made. He reveals to her that he can only be killed at dusk, wrapped in a net with one foot on a cauldron and one on a goat and with a spear forged for a year during the hours when everyone is at mass. With this information she arranges his death.

Struck by the spear thrown by Gronw's hand, Lleu transforms into an eagle and flies away. Gwydion tracks him down and finds him perched high on an oak tree. Through the singing of an englyn (known as englyn Gwydion) he lures him down from the oak tree and switches him back to his human form. Gwydion and Math nurse Lleu back to health before reclaiming his lands from Gronw and Blodeuwedd. In the face-off between Lleu and Gronw, Gronw asks if he may place a large stone between himself and Lleu's spear. Lleu allows him to do so, then throws his spear which pierces both the stone and Gronw, killing him. Gwydion corners Blodeuwedd and turns her into an owl, the creature hated by all other birds. The tale ends with Lleu ascending to the throne of Gwynedd.

=== The Battle of the Trees ===
A large tradition seems to have once surrounded the Battle of the Trees, a mythological conflict fought between the sons of Dôn and the forces of Annwn, the Welsh Otherworld. Amaethon, Gwydion's brother, steals a white roebuck and a whelp from Arawn, king of the otherworld, leading to a great battle.

Gwydion fights alongside his brother and, assisted by Lleu, enchants the "elementary trees and sedges" to rise up as warriors against Arawn's forces. The alder leads the attack, while the aspen falls in battle, and heaven and earth tremble before the oak, a "valiant door keeper against the enemy". The bluebells combine and cause a "consternation" but the hero is the holly, tinted with green.

A warrior fighting alongside Arawn cannot be vanquished unless his enemies can guess his name. Gwydion guesses the warrior's name, identifying him from the sprigs of alder on his shield, and sings two englyns:

Sure-hoofed is my steed impelled by the spur;
The high sprigs of alder are on thy shield;
Bran art thou called, of the glittering branches.

Sure-hoofed is my steed in the day of battle:
The high sprigs of alder are on thy hand:
Bran by the branch thou bearest
Has Amathaon the good prevailed.

=== Other traditions ===
Caer Wydion, the castle of Gwydion, was the traditional Welsh name for the Milky Way.

In the 10th century, Old Welsh "Harleian" genealogies (Harleian MS 3859), mention is made of Lou Hen ("Lou the old") map Guidgen, who most scholars identify with Lleu and Gwydion (who is implied to be Lleu's father in the Mabinogi of Math, though this relationship is not explicitly stated). In the genealogy they are made direct descendants Caratauc son of Cinbelin son of Teuhant (recte Tehuant), who are to be identified with the historical Catuvellaunian leaders Caratacus, Cunobelinus and Tasciovanus.

A number of references to Gwydion can be found in early Welsh poetry. The poem Prif Gyuarch Taliessin asks "Lleu and Gwydion / Will they perform magics?", while in the same corpus, the poem Kadeir Cerridwen relates many familiar traditions concerning Gwydion, including his creating of a woman out of flowers and his bringing of the pigs from the south. This poem also refers to a lost tradition concerning a battle between Gwydion and an unknown enemy at the Nant Ffrangon. Another Taliesin poem, Echrys Ynys refers to Gwynedd as the "Land of Gwydion" while in the Ystoria Taliesin, the legendary bard claims to have been present at Gwydion's birth "before the court of Don".

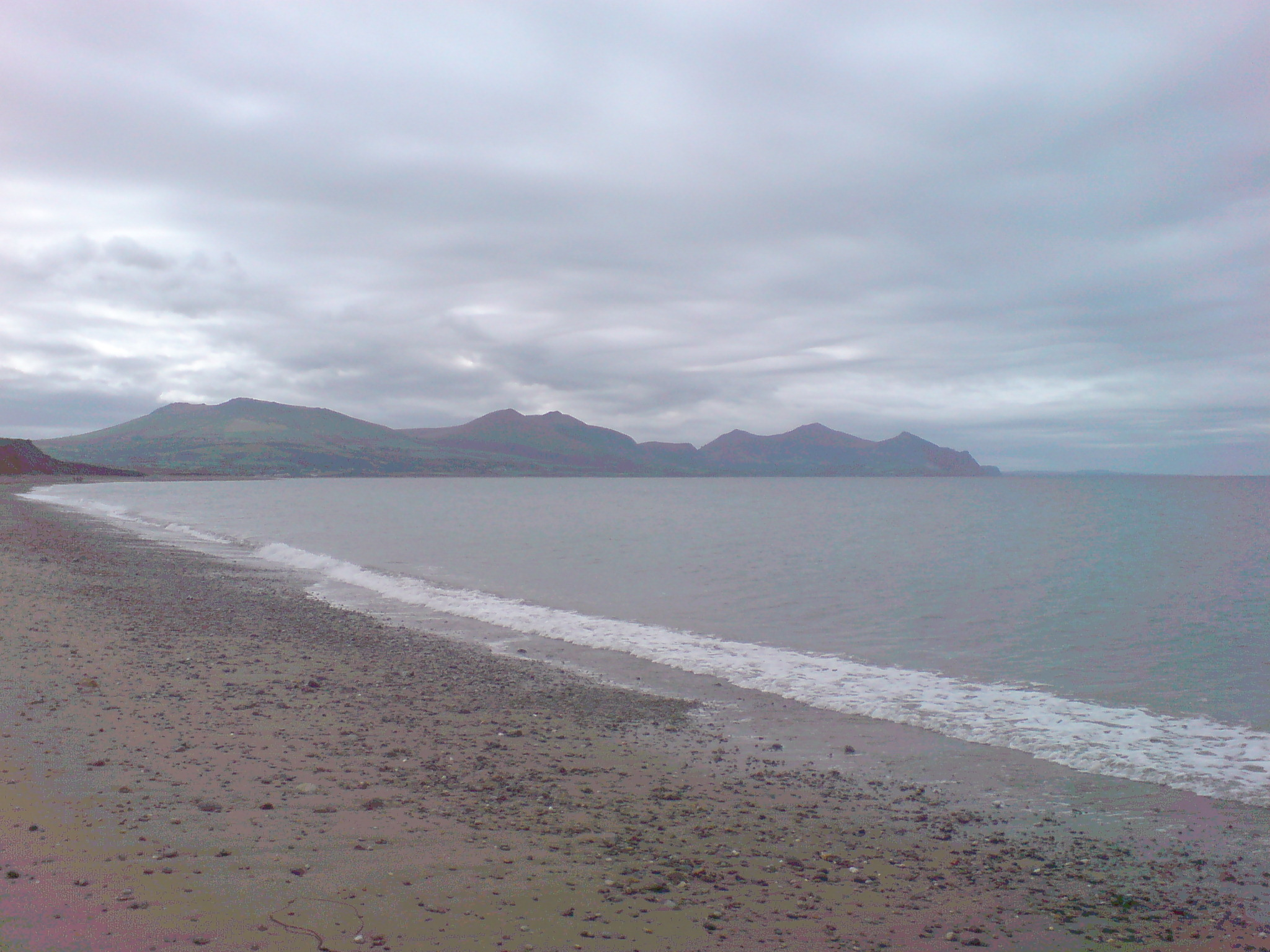
Dinas Dinlle, Gwydion's final resting place.

The Welsh Triads name Gwydion as one of the "Three Golden Shoemakers of the Island of Britain" alongside Manawydan fab Llyr and Caswallawn fab Beli, and records that Math taught him one of the "Three Great Enchantments". The Stanzas of the Graves record that he was buried at Dinas Dinlle, the city of Lleu.

A reference to Gwydion is also made in the Dialogue of Taliesin and Ugnach, a dialogue-poem found in the Black Book of Carmarthen. Within the narrative, the character of Taliesin states:

When I return from Caer Seon
From contending with Jews
I will come to the city of Lleu and Gwydion.

== Gwydion in other media ==
Lloyd Alexander's Chronicles of Prydain, a series of children's fantasy novels inspired by Welsh myths, features a character named Gwydion that is based on the Gwydion of myth but markedly different in moral character. In the Prydain chronicles, Prince Gwydion is a member of the Sons of Don, Prydain's ruling house, and King Math's war leader; he succeeds to the throne when High King Math is slain. Gwydion meets Taran when that Assistant Pig-Keeper chases after his charge, the pig Hen Wen, who has fled their home. Man and boy travel together for some time, until they are captured and separated at Spiral Castle. In the first three books of the five-novel series, Gwydion defeats the Horned King by shouting his real name, leads the quest to secure the Black Cauldron, and helps Taran, Fflewddur Fflam, Gurgi and Prince Rhun rescue Princess Eilonwy from the sorceress Achren. Finally he leads the defense of Caer Dathyl and, as High King, the assault on Annuvin by the sea. In the books, Prince Gwydion is an expert tracker, forester and warrior. As a member of the Royal House of Don, he often wears a pendant depicting a simple golden disk meant to represent the sun.

Patricia Kennealy-Morrison's Keltiad series—Irish, Welsh and Scottish legends translated to an interstellar, Star Wars style context—has a character named Gwydion Prince of Don as its co-protagonist. Like Alexander, Kennealy-Morrison bases her character on the mythological Gwydion, but humanizes him through her own creative process. Lover and First Lord of War to the Queen of Keltia, Aeron Aoibhell, Gwydion ultimately becomes Aeron's husband and King of Keltia, while having numerous adventures based on episodes from the various branches of the Mabinogion. He is a gifted bard, sorcerer and warrior, close to (and descended from) the magical Sidhefolk of Keltia, and is portrayed as Aeron's true and loving partner and her equal in most things. He takes a major part in the epic Battle of the Trees that ends "The Throne of Scone", the chronological last of the books published.

Gwydion is briefly featured in Neil Gaiman's 2001 novel American Gods. He appears as young, eager, acne-prone stockboy at a supermarket in Humansville, Missouri.

Gwydion was a prominent character in the 2003 animated film Y Mabinogi, in which he was voiced by Philip Madoc.

He also appears in Phillip Mann's alternate history series A Land Fit for Heroes, Judith Tarr's fantasy series The Hound and the Falcon and the Alamut series, Robert Carter's "The Language of Stones" series, the books of the Welsh author Jenny Sullivan and in Jenny Nimmo's Snow Spider Trilogy. In The Mists of Avalon, Gwydion is the birth name of both King Arthur and Mordred. Gwydion is given as the real identity of the mage Click, who appears as a minor supporting character in the Junkyard druid series by M D Massey, finally being revealed in book 7, Druid Vengeance. A minor character named Gwydion appears in The Oaken Throne by Robin Jarvis. He is also included in Alan Garner's novel The Owl Service through the character of Huw Halfbacon (the last name a reference to stealing pigs).

The name Gwydion also appears in the Sierra game King's Quest III, where a Prince Alexander of Daventry has been kidnapped by an evil wizard named Manannan who renames him Gwydion.

In the 2018 video game Red Dead Redemption 2, Gwydion is the name of Josiah Trelawny's horse.

In the novel, The Wild Huntress by Emily Lloyd-Jones, Gwydion features as a main character, a Prince of Gwynedd, in this retelling of the Wild Hunt in Annwvyn.
