= Arianrhod =

Figure in Welsh mythology

Arianrhod (Welsh pronunciation: [arˈjanr̥ɔd]) is a figure in Welsh mythology who plays her most important role in the Fourth Branch of the Mabinogi. She is the daughter of Dôn and the sister of Gwydion and Gilfaethwy; the Welsh Triads give her father as Beli Mawr. In the Mabinogi her uncle Math ap Mathonwy is the King of Gwynedd, and during the course of the story she gives birth to two sons, Dylan ail Don and Lleu Llaw Gyffes, through magical means.

== Mabinogion ==
According to the Fourth Branch (circa 12th century), Arianrhod's uncle Math fab Mathonwy would die if he didn't keep his feet in the lap of a virgin when he was not at war. Gilfaethwy develops a lust for Math's original footholder, pretty Goewin, and he and his brother Gwydion engineer a war with King Pryderi of Kingdom of Dyfed, forcing Math to leave his court. In Math's absence, Gilfaethwy rapes Goewin. When Math returns, he punishes his nephews severely by turning them into a series of mated pairs of animals and marries Goewin to alleviate her shame. However, he must find a new virgin to hold his feet.

Gwydion suggests his sister, Arianrhod. To test her virginity, Math tells her to step over his magician's rod. On doing this, however, she immediately gives birth to a young boy, Dylan ail Don, and a blob-like entity which becomes Lleu Llaw Gyffes. Dylan is a sea spirit, who flees to the ocean immediately after he is baptized. Gwydion grabs Lleu Llaw Gyffes before anyone else sees it and places it in a chest. Before long, it becomes a boy who grows at twice the normal rate; when he is four, he is as big as an eight-year-old. Gwydion takes him to see his mother at her home, Caer Arianrhod.

However, Arianrhod was angry about her humiliation at Math's court. She places a tynged (a geis or taboo) on the boy that he will never have a name unless she gives it to him. Gwydion disguises the boy as a shoemaker and returns to Caer Arianrhod; while Arianrhod is being fitted, she sees the boy killing a wren with a single stone and remarks that the fair-haired one ("lleu") has a skillful hand ("llaw gyffes"). Gwydion reveals the disguise, and says she has just given her son a name – Lleu Llaw Gyffes. Arianrhod then places a second tynged on Lleu, that he would never take arms unless she armed him. A few years later, Gwydion and Lleu return to Caer Arianrhod, this time disguised as bards. Gwydion is an accomplished storyteller and entertains her court. That night, while everyone sleeps, he conjures a fleet of warships. Arianrhod gives her guests weapons and armor to help her fight, thereby dispelling her second curse. When Gwydion reveals the trickery, Arianrhod places a final tynged on Lleu: he would never have a wife from any race that is on this earth now. Gwydion and Math eventually break this curse by creating a woman out of oak blossom, broom, and meadowsweet; she is named Blodeuwedd ("flower face").

With her curses, Arianrhod denied Lleu the three aspects of masculinity: a name, arms, and a wife.

== In other sources ==
One of the Welsh Triads, 35 by Rachel Bromwich's numbering, establishes a different family connection for Arianrhod. Her father is named as Beli Mawr, and her brother is Caswallawn (the historical Cassivellaunus). She has two sons by Lliaws son of Nwyfre, Gwenwynwyn and Gwanar, who both accompany Caswallawn in his pursuit of Julius Caesar after he has been chased from Britain. This triad is the only source connecting Arianrhod to Beli Mawr and the Caswallawn saga, but it is not incompatible with the tradition recorded in the Mabinogion.

The stories of Welsh mythology changed over time, and the Mabinogion does not contain the only version of them. Welsh scholar William John Gruffydd noted that 15th- and 16th-century poets apparently knew an alternate tradition in which Arianrhod actually became Math's footholder. Additionally, some scholars have suggested that in an earlier form of the Fourth Branch, Gwydion was the father of Arianrhod's sons.

Arianrhod's palace, Caer Arianrhod, is connected with a rock formation visible westward of Llandwrog, North-West Wales at low tide. This formation is one of several landmarks that attest to the localization of the events in the Fourth Branch in this area. The name "Caer Arianrhod" is also used in Welsh for the constellation Corona Borealis. Robert Graves cites the riddling claim of Taliesin to have spent three periods in the prison/castle of Arianrhod, who Graves considers as "one more aspect of Caridwen, or Ceridwen, the White Goddess...the Muse-goddess".

== Etymology ==
The name "Arianrhod" (from the Welsh arian, "silver," and rhod, "wheel") may be cognate with Proto-Celtic *Arganto-rotā, meaning "silver wheel." Alternatively, the earliest form of the name may have been Aranrot, in which case the first part of the name would be related to "Aran," a word with uncertain meaning, "but 'huge', 'round' or 'humped' would all be possible interpretations."

== In popular culture ==
- The term 'Arianrhod' is used in two different fantasy TV series during 2012. On both occasions it is a term connected to mind control.
  - In the fourth series of Young Dracula, the mind-controlling Rings of Arianrhod are used by Ramanga (Robbie Gee) as part of a plan to kill Vlad Dracula (Gerran Howell) on his wedding day, though the scheme is thwarted by Bertrand De Fortunessa (Cesari Taurasi). Adze Ramanga (Nathasha Stokes) uses the Rings to control Erin Noble (Sydney Rae White) and force her to stand on the roof of Garside Grange School, before striking her with a fireball, causing her to fall. The blast embeds fragments of the Ring in Erin's chest, and they remain there after Vlad turns her into a vampire. The other Ring is used by Count Dracula (Keith-Lee Castle) and Malik Vaccaria (Richard Southgate) to track Ramanga down.
  - In the fifth series of Merlin, Merlin (Colin Morgan) uses the Pool of Arianrhod to undo the brainwashing of Guinevere Pendragon (Angel Coulby) by Morgana Pendragon (Katie McGrath).
- In Mobile Suit Gundam: Iron-Blooded Orphans, the Arianrhod Fleet is the largest and most powerful fleet of ships and Mobile Suits used by the antagonist group Gjallarhorn.
- In Fire Emblem: Three Houses, Arianrhod is the name of a city in the Kingdom of Faerghus. The city is destroyed as an act of vengeance for killing an important leader from Those Who Slither in the Dark.
- In The Legend of Heroes: Trails to Azure and The Legend of Heroes: Trails of Cold Steel III, one of the major antagonists is named Arianrhod.
- In The Wheel of Time, the dream-world Tel'Aran'Rhiod was named after Arianrhod.
- In The Merlin Conspiracy by Diana Wynne Jones, one of the two main protagonists is named Arianrhod.
