= Tynged =

Idiosyncratic taboo, whether of obligation or prohibition, similar to being under a vow

A tynged ("destiny, fate", plural tynghedau) is the Welsh equivalent of the Irish geas, similar to being under a vow, curse or spell. The most famous example is that placed by Arianrhod on her son Lleu Llaw Gyffes in the fourth of the Four Branches of the Mabinogi, the Mabinogi of Math fab Mathonwy, in which his mother doomed him to never have a human wife.

In addition, Lleu was destined to die neither "during the day or night, nor indoors or outdoors, neither riding nor walking, not clothed and not naked, nor by any weapon lawfully made." When his magically created wife, Blodeuwedd, wanted to learn how to kill him in order to be with her lover, she convinced him to show her how he could theoretically be killed at dusk while stepping out of a river onto a riverbank while sheltered by a roof and putting one foot on a goat, and so on.

== Sources ==
- Ifans, Dafydd; Ifans, Rhiannon, eds. (1980). Y Mabinogion. Gomer Press. ISBN 1-85902-260-X.
