= Gronw Pebr =

Gronw Pebr (Welsh pronunciation: [ˈɡrɔnu ˈpɛbr̩]) "Gronw the Radiant" is a warrior, hunter and antagonist in Welsh tradition, appearing primarily in the fourth branch of the Mabinogi as the lord of Penllyn, the lover of Blodeuwedd and the would-be murderer of Lleu Llaw Gyffes. He is also mentioned in the Welsh Triads and in the medieval poem Cad Goddeu.

== Role in Welsh tradition ==
Gronw chances across Blodeuwedd.

Lleu Llaw Gyffes has been placed under a tynged that he would never gain a wife of human birth. His uncle, the trickster and magician Gwydion joins forces with the Venedotian king Math fab Mathonwy to create a woman for Lleu, out of the flowers of oak, broom and meadowsweet, naming her Blodeuwedd. One day, while Lleu is away on business, Gronw Pebr, lord of Penllyn, comes across Lleu's stronghold whilst out hunting and falls in love with Blodeuwedd. They conspire to kill Lleu so that they can be together.

Lleu can only be killed if certain conditions are met, and Blodeuwedd tricks him into revealing what these conditions are. He can not be killed indoors or outdoors, on horseback or on foot. Consequently, he can only be killed whilst he has one foot on a cauldron and one on a goat (the cauldron being placed on a stream bank but under a roof) and by someone using a spear forged over a year and only when people are attending mass.

Blodeuwedd coaxes the secret from Lleu and a year later, Gronw ambushes the prince. He flings the spear at Lleu, who disappears in the form of an eagle. Gronw and Blodeuwedd now assume power, but on hearing the news of his nephew Gwydion sets out to find and cure him. He finds Lleu in the form of a wounded eagle perched in an oak tree and restores him to human form.

Together they overcome Gronw, and make him stand in the same position that Lleu occupied when Gronw flung the spear at him. Gronw is allowed to hold a stone as a shield, but Lleu throws the spear so hard that it penetrates the stone and kills Gronw. Gwydion curses Blodeuwedd, turning her into an owl.
