= Math fab Mathonwy =

Welsh king of Gwynedd

In Welsh mythology, Math fab Mathonwy (Welsh pronunciation: [ˈmaːθ ˈvaːb maˈθɔnʊɨ]), also called Math ap Mathonwy (Math, son of Mathonwy) was a king of Gwynedd who needed to rest his feet in the lap of a virgin unless he was at war, or he would die. The story of Math is the fourth of the Four Branches of the Mabinogi.

== The Mabinogi of Math ==
=== Math is tricked by his nephews ===
Math's nephew Gilfaethwy had become obsessed with Goewin, Math's footholder. The magician Gwydion (Gilfaethwy's brother) devised a plan to make Goewin available. Gwydion told his uncle about an animal that was new to Wales, called pigs, and how he could get them from their owner, Pryderi of Dyfed. He took a band of men, including his brother, to Ceredigion, where they disguised themselves as bards to gain audience with King Pryderi.

Gwydion was a skilled cyfarwydd (storyteller) and regaled the court with his tales. Having charmed the king, he offered to trade the pigs for some horses and dogs, which he had conjured through magic. Pryderi agreed to the trade and Gwydion and his men took the pigs back home to Gwynedd, but his trickery was revealed and Pryderi waged war against Gwynedd. While Math went to battle, Gilfaethwy raped Goewin.

The war ended when Gwydion killed Pryderi in single combat. Upon his return to his castle, King Math went to rest his feet in Goewin's lap, but could not, as she was no longer a virgin. He took her as his wife to save her honour, and then as punishment, banished his nephews, turning them into a breeding pair of deer for a year. He then turned them into wild boars for the next year and wolves the year after that. They had three children over the three years: Hyddwn, Hychddwn, and Bleiddwn.

=== Gwydion and his nephew ===
After their punishment was over, Math asked their advice as to who should be his next virgin footholder. Gwydion suggested his sister, Arianrhod. However, Arianrhod was not a virgin, and when asked to step over Math's rod in order to prove her virginity she immediately gave birth to a son. Abandoning the child she fled in shame, letting drop a "lump of flesh" which was borne away by Gwydion and concealed in a chest. When Gwydion later opens the chest he discovered the lump of flesh to be a second child.

Meanwhile, the firstborn son of Arianrhod was acknowledged by his great uncle Math and given the name Dylan upon baptism. However, as soon as Dylan came in contact with his baptismal waters, he plunged into the sea and took on characteristics of a sea creature, moving through the seawater as perfectly as any fish, thus earning his new name, Dylan ail Don, "Dylan second wave": "So they had the boy baptized, and as they baptized him he plunged into the sea. And immediately when he was in the sea, he took its nature, and swam as well as the best fish that was therein."

The unnamed second child grew precociously and he and Gwydion grew very attached to one another. After four years Gwydion took the boy to see his mother, who refused to recognise him out of shame and anger that Gwydion should have nurtured the boy, and placed a tynged on him that he should have no name unless she gave it to him. To trick her into naming him, Gwydion disguised himself and the boy as shoemakers and as they were making shoes for her, the boy threw a stone at a bird and killed it. Arianrhod declared "The fair one struck with a deft hand", and thus he was named Lleu Llaw Gyffes, "Fair-Haired One of the Skillful Hand".

His trick revealed, Arianrhod placed a tynged on the boy again that he would not take up arms until she gave them to him. Time passed and Lleu grew big and strong. Again, Gwydion disguised his nephew and himself, this time as bards, and like he did to King Pryderi, entertained Arianrhod's court with stories. In the morning, Gwydion deceived Arianrhod to believe that her estate was under attack. When she asked for his advice, he bade her gird a sword on Lleu Llaw Gyffes, who he said was a skilful fighter. No sooner had she done so than Gwydion revealed the truth.

Furious at being tricked again, Arianrhod placed a tynged on her son once more, that he would never have a human wife. By this time, Math had come to sympathize with Gwydion. Together, they created a woman from the flowers of the oak, broom and meadowsweet and brought her to life, giving her the name Blodeuwedd "Flower-Faced".

=== Lleu and Blodeuwedd ===
One day, when Lleu was away from home visiting Math, Blodeuwedd saw a nobleman, named Gronw Pebr, passing and invited him to stay (for it would be rude not do so). They fell in love and concocted a plot to kill Lleu. Blodeuwedd elicited from Lleu how he could be killed — with one foot on the back of a goat and the other on the rim of a bath of water, underneath a canopy, using a spear that had been made over the course of a year only on Sundays whilst the people were at Mass. She told this to Gronw and he set out to make the spear.

A year later, she persuaded Lleu to demonstrate this odd position where he might be killed. Suspecting nothing, he did so. Gronw, who had been waiting in ambush, threw the spear he had made at him. However, rather than dying outright Lleu turned into an eagle and flew away wounded. Gronw then took Blodeuwedd and Lleu's land. Gwydion went searching for his nephew and, by following a pig, found him (still an eagle) in a very bad state at the top of an oak tree by a lake. He called him down from the tree with three stanzas of poetry called the englynion Gwydion, transformed him back into a man and with Math nursed him back to health. Then Lleu sought revenge on Gronw and his wife.

Blodeuwedd heard of this and fled, taking her maidens with her, but they were so frightened, that they ended up walking backwards to make sure nobody attacked them from behind. Unfortunately, they ended up falling into a lake (Llyn y Morwynion on the moors above Ffestiniog), with only Blodeuwedd surviving. Gwydion captured her and instead of killing her, turned her into an owl and cursed her with this form permanently through giving her the name Blodeuwedd ("Flower-Face"), reflecting the owl's appearance.

Gronw offered Lleu land or money as payment, but Lleu would only accept one resolution: that he throw a spear at Gronw in the same way that he had been attacked. Gronw accepted, but asked that a large stone be placed between him and Lleu. Nevertheless, Lleu threw the spear right through the stone and killed Gronw. After this he took back his lands and later succeeded Math as king of Gwynedd.

== Etymology ==
The name Math is thought to derive from the Proto-Celtic *matu- meaning "good" or "fortunate" but also being a euphemism for a bear.
