= Gofannon =

Welsh mythological figure

Gofannon (Welsh pronunciation: [ɡɔˈvanɔn]) is a figure in Middle Welsh literature as a great metal worker and as the son of Dôn. His name can be compared with the Old Irish gobae (gen. gobann) ‘smith’, Middle Welsh / Cornish / Breton gof (pl. gofein) ‘smith’, Gaulish gobedbi ‘with the smiths’, all of which are cognate with Lithuanian gabija ‘sacred home fire’, gabus ‘gifted, clever’. His apparent counterpart in Irish mythology, Goibniu, in addition to his duties as a smith, also takes on the role of a divine hero who brewed an ale of immortality, in addition to being an architect and builder.

In Welsh mythology, Gofannon killed his nephew, Dylan Ail Don, not knowing who he was. One of the tasks given to Culhwch if he were to win the hand of Olwen was to get Gofannon to sharpen his brother Amaethon's plough.
