= Goewin =

Welsh mythological figure

Goewin (Welsh pronunciation: [ˈɡɔɨwɪn]) is a figure in Welsh mythology, where she has a small but crucial role in the Math fab Mathonwy, one of the Four Branches of the Mabinogi.

== Narrative ==
At the beginning of the tale, the eponymous Math fab Mathonwy will die if his feet are not always held in the lap of a virgin or he is at war; Goewin is the virgin who performs this duty until Math is tricked into going to war by his nephews Gwydion and Gilfaethwy, who proceed to rape Goewin. Once Math returns, Goewin reveals the crime and Math punishes the two by transforming them into a series of animals. He then marries Goewin, giving her power over his kingdom, in order to make amends.
