= Gilfaethwy =

Character on Welsh mythology

In Welsh mythology, Gilfaethwy (Welsh pronunciation: [ɡɪlˈvɑːɨ̯θ.ʊ̯ɨ]) was a son of the goddess Dôn and brother of Gwydion and Arianrhod in the Fourth Branch of the Mabinogi.

His uncle Math fab Mathonwy, king of Gwynedd, must keep his feet in the lap of a young virgin at all times unless he is going to war. Gilfaethwy lusts after Math's current foot holder, Goewin, so to get her alone he and Gwydion steal pigs from Pryderi, king of Dyfed, sparking a conflict between the neighboring kingdoms. While his uncle is off fighting, Gilfaethwy sneaks back to Gwynedd and rapes Goewin. Math is furious when he discovers this, and punishes his nephews by transforming them into a series of paired animals using his great skill in magic, thus impressing vividly upon them the brutish (and brutal) nature of their transgressions. For a year Gilfaethwy becomes a hind deer and Gwydion a stag; they mate and produce an offspring, Hyddwn, which is delivered to Math. Next Math makes Gilfaethwy a boar and Gwydion a sow, and together they birth Hychddwn; when they return a year later with the sons, he makes them wolves, and finally they give birth to Bleiddwn. After the third year he relieves them of their punishment and makes them human again.

Gilfaethwy is a minor character in Welsh legend, and may have been used in the Fourth Branch simply to advance the story of his more illustrious brother Gwydion.

== In Arthurian romance ==
Like many another character in the Mabinogion, Gilfaethwy has given rise to a character or characters in Arthurian romance - in this instance Sir Griflet, who first appears as Girflet ( or Giflet ) fils Do in the romance Erec et Enide by the twelfth century Champénois master Chrétien de Troyes and appears later as the eponymous hero of the romance Jaufre, the only surviving romance written in the Occitan language.

Loomis wrote that Dôn, goddess mother of Gilfaethwy, had been misconstrued to be a male character by at least as early as the time of composition of Chretien's Erec et Enide :

The Arthurian Do or Don, father of Giflet and Lore, has undergone a strange metamorphosis, from an ancient Brythonic goddess into the castellan of Carlisle and the chief forester of Uterpandragon.

The Lore in the above-quoted passage concerning Don is an abbreviated form of Florée, the Flower Bride, an Arthurian cognate of the Irish Blathnat and Welsh Blodeuwedd.
