= Four Branches of the Mabinogi =

Collection of Welsh mythological stories

The Four Branches of the Mabinogi or Pedair Cainc Y Mabinogi are four medieval Welsh stories contained in the collection Mabinogion. They are rooted in Welsh mythology and legend; as literature, they may also be described as romances or magical fantasies and contain political themes. The tales have been translated from the original Middle Welsh into other languages, including English. The Four Branches of the Mabinogi are the earliest prose stories in the literature of Britain. They are popular today in book format, as storytelling or theatre performances; they appear in recordings and on film, and continue to inspire reinterpretations in artwork and modern fiction, such as the New Stories of the Mabinogion series and The Assembly of the Severed Head by Hugh Lupton.

== Overview ==
The Mabinogi are known as the Four Branches of the Mabinogi, or Pedair Cainc y Mabinogi in Welsh. The tales were compiled from oral tradition in the 11th century. They survived in private family libraries via medieval manuscripts, of which two main versions and some fragments continue to survive today. Early modern scholarship of the Mabinogi saw the tales as a garbled Welsh mythology which prompted attempts to salvage or reconstruct them. Since the 1970s the tales have become recognised as a complex secular literature, though rooted in and containing elements of Welsh mythology, with powerfully explored characters, political, ethical and gendered themes, as well as imaginative fantasies. The style of writing is admired for its deceptive simplicity and controlled wordpower, as well as intricate doublets where mirrorings have been compared to Celtic knotwork. The world displayed within the Mabinogi extends across Wales, to Ireland, and into England. It presents a legendary Britain as a united land under a king, yet with powerful separate princedoms, where native Welsh law, hud (magic), and romance, combine in a unique synergy. Possible authors who have been proposed for the Four Branches include Rhigyfarch and Gwenllian ferch Gruffydd.

Each Branch contains several tale episodes in a sequence, and each Branch is titled with the name of a leading protagonist. These titles are Pwyll, Branwen, Manawydan and Math, but this is a modern custom; the Branches are not titled in the mediaeval manuscripts. Only one character appears in all four Branches, Pryderi, though he is never dominant or central to any of the Branches.

- Pwyll Prince of Dyfed tells of the heroic and magical sojourn of Pwyll in Annwfn, his shapeshifting, chastity and a duel, which all establish a mighty alliance. The formidable Rhiannon courts him, and he helps her win her freedom to marry him. The strange abduction at birth of their baby son follows, with his rescue, fostering and restoration by the good lord Teyrnon of the Kingdom of Gwent. The child is named Pryderi.
- Branwen Daughter of Llŷr follows Branwen's marriage to the King of Ireland, who abuses her due to insult by her half brother, Efnysien. A tragically genocidal war develops fomented by Efnysien, in which a Cauldron which resurrects the dead figures, and the giant king Bran's head survives his death in an enchanted idyll. Pryderi is merely named as a war survivor, and Branwen dies, heartbroken.
- Manawydan Son of Llŷr brother of Branwen, heir to the throne of Britain, becomes Pryderi's good friend during the war. Pryderi arranges his friend's marriage to Rhiannon. The land of Dyfed is devastated. Journeys in England setting up craft businesses follow. An enchanted trap removes Pryderi and Rhiannon: Manawydan becomes a farmer. He cannily negotiates their release, as well as the restoration of the land, by confronting the villain behind it all.
- Math Son of Mathonwy is a dark sequence of deception and treachery: war with Dyfed, the death of Pryderi, the double rape of a virgin girl, and the rejection of an unwanted hero son by proud Arianrhod. Gwydion her magician brother is the architect of all these destinies. He adds an artificially incubated pregnancy, and a synthetic woman. She, Blodeuwedd, creates a treacherous love triangle, murder in a peculiar manner. Gwydion makes a shamanic journey of redemption.

== The Branches ==
=== First branch: Pwyll, Prince of Dyfed ===
Pwyll Pendefeg Dyfed, "Pwyll Prince of Dyfed", hunting on his own land, meets the shining Cŵn Annwn or "Hounds of Annwfn", and takes another man's kill, a stag, for himself. Arawn, the king of Annwfn, is greatly offended. As recompense, Pwyll switches bodies with Arawn and dwells in Annwfn to vanquish Arawn's adversary. Pwyll chastely shares the queen's bed for a year. Pwyll defeats Arawn's enemy Hafgan, and is then rewarded with an alliance between his land of Dyfed, and Annwfn. Pwyll then returns home to Dyfed where he finds it has been well ruled by Arawn in the past year.

Next, Pwyll encounters Rhiannon, a beautiful and powerful maiden on a shining magical horse. They are strangely unreachable by anyone, for as they attempt to approach, Rhiannon and her horse get further away. Finally, they ask her to stop in which she complies and it is revealed that Rhiannon has chosen Pwyll as her husband, which he welcomes. On Rhiannon and Pwyll's wedding day in the court of Hyfaidd Hen, Gwawl appears in disguise and tricks Pwyll into giving him the entire wedding feast and Rhiannon. Rhiannon then guides Pwyll through a cunning strategy using her magic bag which can never be filled, to extricate her from her betrothal to the princely Gwawl. Gwawl is trapped in the bag and beaten by Pwyll's men until he agrees to Rhiannon's terms, including foregoing vengeance.

Rhiannon eventually bears Pwyll a son and heir, but the child disappears the night he is born. Rhiannon's maids, in fear of their lives, accuse her of killing and eating her own baby. Rhiannon negotiates a penalty where she must sit at the castle gate every day for seven years telling her terrible tale to strangers and offer them a ride on her back. Meanwhile, the child is rescued from its monstrous abductor by Teyrnon Twrf Lliant. He and his wife adopt the boy who grows heroically apace, and adores horses. They called him Gwri Wallt Efryn (Gwri 'Golden Hair', Welsh: Gwallt Euraid). Teyrnon sees the boy's resemblance to Pwyll, so he restores the boy to Dyfed for a happy ending. Rhiannon is vindicated as is Pwyll's loyalty to her. Their son is renamed Pryderi "Loss", as is custom from his mother's first words to him: Pryderi puns on anxiety and labour. In due course, Pryderi inherits the rule of Dyfed.

=== Second Branch: Branwen, Daughter of Llŷr ===
In the second branch, Branwen, sister of Brân the Blessed, king of Britain, is requested by and given in marriage to Matholwch, king of Ireland. Brân's half-brother Efnysien, angered that no one consulted him, insults Matholwch by mutilating all his valuable horses so horribly they become useless. Brân the Blessed gives Matholwch compensation in the form of new horses and treasure, then added a magical cauldron (Welsh: Pair Dadeni) which can restore the dead to life, although the revived persons will always remain unable to speak. The legend of this cauldron, when the two kings compare its lore, is that it came from Ireland.

In Ireland, Matholwch and Branwen have a son, Gwern. The Irish nobles continue to be hostile because of what Efnysien did. Matholwch allows them to sway him, and casts Branwen away to serf in the kitchens, struck on the face every day by a low-caste butcher. Branwen trains a starling to take a message to Brân across the Irish Sea. He musters his host and crosses the sea to war on Matholwch. Brân is so huge he wades across with his ships beside him. Branwen persuades the Irish to sue for peace by building a colossal building to house Brân, which he has never had before.

The Irish hide two hundred warriors in the house, hanging in bags on its pillars. Efnysien shrewdly suspects treachery and disbelieves the Irish story these are bags of flour. He crushes the skull of each hidden warrior, singing after he does it. Later, at the feast, Efnysien deliberately seeks to create discord. He throws his infant nephew Gwern on the fire and kills him. Fighting breaks out and the Irish use the Cauldron to revive their dead. Efnysien hides among the corpses to get in the Cauldron, stretches and cracks it, dying as he does so.

The war had become a genocide. Five pregnant women survive to repopulate Ireland. Only Seven Survivors remained of the British host, besides Branwen. One is Manawydan, Branwen's other brother, and his good friend Pryderi. Brân, mortally wounded by a poisoned spear, bids the survivors to cut off his head, and take it to bury at the White Tower in London. He prophesies his head will be their good companion and advise them, while they will sojourn for many years of idyllic feasting, first at Harlech in Gwynedd, then on the isle of Gwales in Dyfed. But on arriving back in Britain, Branwen dies of grief for the many who have died.

Brân means 'raven'; Branwen means 'white raven'; and Efnysien means 'trouble, strife'.

=== Third Branch: Manawydan, son of Llŷr ===
Pryderi of Dyfed returns from the Irish War as one of its few survivors, to reunite with his mother Rhiannon, and his wife Cigfa. He brings with him his beloved war comrade, Manawydan, the heir to the kingship of all Britain. But Manawydan's rights as heir to Britain have been usurped by Caswallon, and he does not want more war. Pryderi establishes him as the lord of Dyfed, including marriage to Rhiannon, a union which both partners welcome. The four of them, Pryderi, Cigfa, Rhiannon and her new husband Manawydan, become very good friends indeed, and travel the land of Dyfed admiring how bountiful it is.

Together they sit the Gorsedd Arberth, as Pwyll once did. A clap of thunder, a bright light, and magical mist descend. Afterwards the land is devastated of all other life except wild animals. The four live by hunting, but after two years they want more, so they travel to England. In three towns in turn they craft saddles, shields and shoes of such quality that the local craftsmen cannot compete, so their envy becomes dangerous. Pryderi dislikes the lower class way of life, and Manawydan stops him from fighting their enemies. Instead Manawydan insists on moving away. After three attempts like this, they return to Dyfed.

Once more living as hunters Pryderi and Manawydan follow a shining white boar to a strange castle. Pryderi, against Manawydan's advice, follows his hounds inside to become trapped there by a golden bowl. Manawydan waits, then reports to Rhiannon who rebukes his failure to rescue his friend. But when she follows her son she too becomes trapped. Alone with Cigfa, Manawydan reassures her he will respect her virtue. After another attempt in England as shoemakers, the pair return to Dyfed, and Manawydan farms three fields of wheat next to Gorsedd Arberth. But his first field's harvest is cut down by thieves, and his second. He sits vigil at night, and sees a horde of mice eating the ripe corn. He catches a slow, fat one. Against Cigfa's protest he sets up a miniature gibbet to hang it as a thief.

A scholar, a priest and a bishop in turn offer him money if he will spare the mouse which he refuses. When asked what he wants for the mouse's life he first demands an explanation. The bishop tells him he is Llwyd, friend of the wronged Gwawl, the mouse is Llwyd's shapeshiften wife, and the devastation of Dyfed is to avenge Gwawl. Manawydan bargains to release of Pryderi and Rhiannon, and the lifting of the curse on Dyfed.

=== Fourth Branch: Math, son of Mathonwy ===
Gwynedd in North Wales is ruled by the magician king Math fab Mathonwy, whose feet must be held by a virgin at all times except while he is at war. Math's nephew Gilfaethwy is infatuated with Goewin, the royal maiden foot-holder, so Gilfaethwy's brother Gwydion plots to aid him. He deceives Pryderi of Dyfed with magical sham gifts of horses and dogs, in exchange for Pryderi's valuable swine, a gift from Annwfn. Dyfed makes war in revenge, so Math leaves Goewin without his protection. Gwydion and Gilfaethwy rape her, and Gwydion kills Pryderi in single combat. Math marries Goewin in compensation for her rape. He punishes the two brothers by shapeshifting them into animal pairs who must mate and bear young; first deer, then boars, then wolves. The sons they bear become Math's foster sons, and after three years the brothers are reconciled with Math.

Gwydion suggests his sister Arianrhod as the new footholder. Math magically tests her virginity requiring her to step over his wand. She immediately gives birth to a son, Dylan ail Don, who takes to the sea. She also drops a scrap of life which Gwydion scoops up and incubates in a chest by his bed. Arianrhod is deeply shamed and angered so she utterly rejects the boy. She swears a doom upon him that he cannot have a name, nor warrior arms, unless she gives them to him. Gwydion tricks her into naming the boy Lleu Llaw Gyffes (Bright Skillful Hand) by speaking to him, not knowing who he is as he is shapeshifted. More shapeshifting fakes a military attack so Arianrhod gives them arms - dressing and arming Lleu herself.

Arianrhod's third curse is Lleu may not marry a human woman. Gwydion and Math construct a beautiful wife for him from oak blossom, broom flowers, and meadowsweet, naming her Blodeuwedd (Flower Face). But Blodeuwedd and Gronw Pebr fall deeply in love. Gronw tells her to find out the secret of Lleu's protected life, which she does in the trust of her marriage bed. She begs Lleu to explain so she can know how to protect him. The method is complicated, taking a year of almost impossible effort but Gronw completes it and Lleu falls to his spear, transforms into an eagle and departs. Blodeuwedd and Gronw then live together.

Gwydion pursues a quest to find Lleu, who far away in eagle form perches up a tree, dying. Gwydion tracks a sow which he finds eating maggots falling from Lleu's rotting body. Gwydion sings a magical englyn (poem) gradually bringing Lleu back to humanity. Gronw offers to compensate Lleu; but Lleu insists on returning the blow as it was struck against him. Gronw is cowardly and attempts to evade it using a stone shield. Lleu kills Gronw with his spear, which pierces him through the stone. Gwydion punishes Blodeuwedd by transforming her into an owl, a pariah among birds.

== Locations ==
Some of the locations mentioned in the text have been identified in reality. Many are associated with Arberth and the surrounding district. Some have not been identified and may be methodological or in need of further archeological and historical discoveries (ex. Caer Dathyl).

== Manuscripts ==
The three medieval manuscripts of the Four Branches which have survived into modern times were copied in the 13th and 14th centuries, later than the likely composition of the work around the eleventh or twelfth centuries. The text does not greatly differ between these manuscripts, but it is thought that they are not copies of each other, but of lost earlier originals. The oldest is only a fragment: Peniarth 6, c. 1225, containing parts of the Second and Third Branches. The other two are named by the colour of their covers: LLyfr Gwyn ("White Book") and Llyfr Coch ("Red Book").

The oldest manuscript containing a complete text is in the White Book of Rhydderch (Llyfr Gwyn Rhydderch), one of the Peniarth Manuscripts. It was copied around 1350 by five different scribes, probably commissioned by Ieuan ab Rhydderch ab Ieuan Llwyd near Ceredigion. It was then copied and studied by various Welsh scholars. About 1658, it was acquired by the antiquary Robert Vaughan and preserved in his famous library of Hengwrt near Dolgellau, Gwynedd. In 1859 it was passed to the Peniarth library by William Watkin Edward Wynne. Finally, John Williams presented it to the National Library of Wales in 1904, where it can be viewed today in two volumes.

The second surprising manuscript to contain a complete version is the Red Book of Hergest (Llyfr Coch Hergest), copied around 1382–1410, in a time of unrest culminating in Owain Glyndŵr's uprising. The scribe has been identified as Hywel Fychan fab Hywel Goch of Buellt, who worked for Hopcyn ap Tomas ab Einion (fl. 1337–1408) near Swansea. The Hopcyn library changed hands due to war and politics several times, with owners including the Vaughans of Hergest. The manuscript continued to change hands, sometimes slightly dubiously via 'borrowing'. Edward Lhuyd was one of many who copied it to study. In 1701 it was donated to Jesus College, Oxford, where it remains today. Here it was copied by the young Ioan Tegid when a student at University of Oxford c. 1815-17 for Charles Bosanquet. Later Tegid, as a senior bard and scholar, assisted Lady Charlotte Guest in her bilingual publication series, The Mabinogion, which brought the tales to the modern world. Her volume containing the Four Branches was published in 1845, and her work is still popular today.

Welsh Icons United a 2014 exhibition at the National Library of Wales, guested the Llyfr Coch, the Red Book, as part of its display, thus bringing the two main Mabinogi MSS. under one roof for the first time.

== Editions ==
=== All of The Four Branches ===
- Ifor Williams (ed.), Pedeir Keinc y Mabinogi, Allan o Lyfr Gwyn Rhydderch (Cambridge: Cambridge University Press, 1930). Reprinted 1951. Middle Welsh spelling, making critical use of all the surviving manuscripts.
- J. M. Edwards (ed.), Mabinogion (o Lyfr Coch Hergest): Pwyll, Pendefig Dyfed, Branwen Ferch Llyr, Manawyddan fab Llyr, Math fab Mathonwy (Wrecsam: Hughes A'i Fab, 1921). Modern Welsh spelling.
- The White Book of the Mabinogion: Welsh Tales and Romances Reproduced from the Peniarth Manuscripts. Series of Welsh Texts 7. Pwllheli.

=== Individual branches ===
The Four Branches are edited individually in Middle Welsh with English glossary and notes as follows:

- First Branch: R. L. Thomson (ed.), Pwyll Pendeuic Dyuet. Dublin: Dublin Institute for Advanced Studies, 1957.
- Second Branch: D. S. Thomson (ed.), Branwen Uerch Lyr. Dublin: Dublin Institute for Advanced Studies, 1976.
- Fourth Branch: Ian Hughes (ed.), Math Uab Mathonwy: The Fourth Branch of the Mabinogi. Dublin: Dublin Institute for Advanced Studies, School of Celtic Studies, 2013, ISBN 978-1-85500-222-7
- Third Branch: Patrick K. Ford, Manawydan uab Llyr. Belmont, Mass.: Ford and Bailie, 2000.
- Fourth Branch: Patrick K. Ford, Math uab Mathonwy. Belmont, Mass.: Ford and Bailie, 1999.

== See also ==
- Mabinogion, a larger collection of Welsh medieval literary tales

== Resources ==
=== Introductory ===
- ONLINE - FREE translation in English, a page for each Branch, by Will Parker. Includes footnotes.
- BOOK John Bollard's edition in English, 'Legend and Landscape of Wales: The Mabinogi' 2007. Illustrated with photographs of the sites in the tales. (See Translations)
- VIDEO Cybi. (1996) The Mabinogion. Partly free on YouTube, fuller version of the retelling on DVD, by Cybi the laughing monk. Valley Stream.
- RECORDING Jones, Colin. 2008. “Mabinogion, the Four Branches.” Recordings of the Guest text, with background music. The first episode is free on the site.
- Tales from the Mabinogion, trans. Gwyn Thomas. Illustrated by Margaret Jones. 2006.

=== Key resources for study ===
- Morgain, Shan. (2013) The Mabinogi Bibliography. Comprehensive annotated bibliography, searchable on tags; can derive citations. Includes much material on the wider Mabinogion, and some background context e.g. history, language.
- Parker, Will. (2002) “Bibliographic Essay. The Four Branches of the Mabinogi, A Medieval Celtic Text; English Language Scholarship 1795-1997.” Mabinogi.net. A survey of Mabinogi scholarship from the 19thC to the end of the 20thC.
- Parker, Will. (2003) Annotated translation of the Four Branches. Mabinogi.net. Translations made for his book (Parker, Will. (2005) The Four Branches of the Mabinogi. Dublin: Bardic Press. See www.mabinogi.net for Parker's articles.

=== Translations into English ===
- Pughe, William Owen. 1795. “The Mabinogion, or Juvenile Amusements, Being Ancient Welsh Romances.” Cambrian Register, 177–87. First publication, and English trans. of the first story in the First Branch. Also: Pughe, William Owen. 1829. “The Mabinogi: Or, the Romance of Math Ab Mathonwy.” The Cambrian Quarterly Magazine and Celtic Repository 1: 170–79. English trans. of the First Branch.
- Guest, Charlotte (1845). Guest, Charlotte (ed.). The Mabinogion. Llandovery, Wales; and London. Guest's trans. continue to introduce many to the stories today in her characteristically flowing style.
- Ellis, Thomas Peter., and Lloyd, John; trans. (1929) The Mabinogion: A New Translation by T.P. Ellis and John Lloyd. Oxford: Clarendon Press. An accurate and useful edition for students.
- Jones, Gwyn and Thomas Jones; trans. (1949) The Mabinogion. Everyman's Library, 1949; revised 1974, 1989, 1993. The first major edition to supplant Guest.
  - 2001 Edition, (Preface by John Updike), ISBN 0-375-41175-5.
- Gantz, Jeffrey; trans. (1976) The Mabinogion. London and New York: Penguin Books. ISBN 0-14-044322-3. A popular edition for many years, still very readable pocket edition.
- Ford, Patrick K.; trans. (1977)The Mabinogi and Other Medieval Welsh Tales. Berkeley: University of California Press. ISBN 0-520-03414-7. Focuses on the native tales of the Mabinogion, including the Mabinogi.
- Parker, Will. 2003. “Mabinogi Translations." Very useful free online resource for instant access, and quick checks.
- Bollard, John K. trans, and Griffiths, Anthony; photog. (2006) The Mabinogi: Legend and Landscape of Wales. Gomer Press, Llandysul. ISBN 1-84323-348-7. An excellent introduction, clear, beautifully designed, with photographs of the Mabinogi sites today.
- Davies, Sioned. (2007) The Mabinogion. Oxford: Oxford University Press. ISBN 0-19-283242-5. A modern edition in practical format, backed by solid scholarship.
- J. R. R. Tolkien began work on a translation of Pwyll Prince of Dyfed. His translation is held at the Bodleian Library.

=== Modern interpretations ===
- Walton, Evangeline. "The Mabinogion Tetralogy." Prose retelling. "The Island of the Mighty" 1970, first publ. as "The Virgin and the Swine" 1936; "The Children of Llyr" 1971; "The Song of Rhiannon" 1972; "Prince of Annwn" 1974. As a tetralogy New York: Ballantine Books. ISBN 978-1-58567-504-3.
- Cybi. (1996) The Mabinogion. Partly free on YouTube and a fuller version of the retelling on DVD, by Cybi the laughing monk. Valley Stream. A lovely intro.
- Hayes, Derek W. (2007). Otherworld. S4C / BBC Wales. Animation and video with leading musicians and actors, using cutting edge CGI tech. of the time, an impressive work. See artwork on the site.
- Arberth Studios. (2008) Rhiannon: Curse Of The Four Branches (PC DVD). Not very closely based, more loosely inspired.
- Eames, Manon. (2008) Magnificent Myths of the Mabinogi. Stage performance of the full Mabinogi, in Aberystwyth. Staged in a slightly abridged version by Jill Williams at the Pontardawe Arts Centre, 2009. Each was performed by youth theatre.
- Jones, Colin. 2008. Mabinogion, the Four Branches. Recordings of the Guest text, with atmospheric background music. The first episode is free on the site.
- In 2009 Seren Books began publishing a radical new interpretation of the tales, as a series, setting them in modern times and in different countries. The series completed 2014. See here.
- Damh the Bard has released three albums retelling the first three branches in a combination of song and spoken word with accompaniment. "Y Mabinogi - The First Branch" (2017), "Y Mabinogi - The Second Branch" (2018), "Y Mabinogi - The Third Branch" (2020). As of 2024, the final album is forthcoming. See here.
