= Nine sorceresses =

Arthurian Legend element

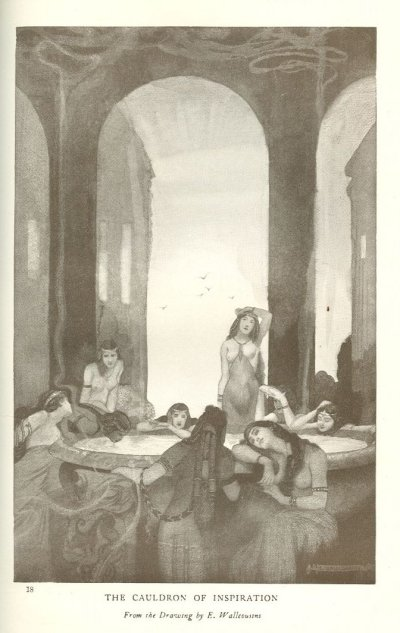
The nine maidens of Annwn in "The Cauldron of Inspiration", Ernest Wallcousins' illustration for the Mabinogion (1912)

The nine sorceresses, also known as the nine witches, nine maidens or nine sisters (Welsh: naw chwaer), are a recurring element in the Arthurian legend in variants of the popular nine maidens theme from world mythologies. Their most important appearances are in Geoffrey of Monmouth's introduction of Avalon as the sisters of the character that would later become Morgan le Fay, and as the central motif of Peredur's story in the Peredur son of Efrawg part of the Mabinogion.

== Nine maidens of Annwfn and nine witches of Ystawingun ==
In Preiddeu Annwfn, the nine virgin priestesses of the otherworldy island of Annwfn (Annwn, the Welsh version of the Celtic Otherworld) guard a magic cauldron, and their magic abilities seem to include fire-breathing. A raid by Arthur and his warband either steals or destroys the cauldron, but what happens to the maidens of Annwfn is not mentioned. The motif of nine supernatural women appears also in some other tales of the Celtic Otherworld, possibly derived from sisterhoods of priestesses of the old Celtic Religion.

The nine witches of Ystawingun (Ystavingun) are mentioned in a single line of the poem Pa gur (around 1100), where the feat of slaying them in this highland is listed among the greatest achievements of Cai (Kay in later tradition). Ystawingun is unidentified but might be associated with Stanton Moor and its stone circle known as "Nine Ladies" or with Porthsgiwed. According to John and Caitlin Matthews, the women whose killing Cai is credited with in Pa gur are in fact the same as the pagan priestesses from Preiddeu Annwfn.

Scholars like Norris J. Lacy and John T. Koch make an additional (besides Preiddeu Annwfn) connection also to the nine witch sisters and their mother in the 7th-century Breton hagiography Vita Prima Samsonis. Her description resembles that of the Irish goddess Mórrígan. In this work, Saint Samson of Dol encounters just one of the sisters, a wild-looking wicked witch (malefica) calling herself Theomacha (Enemy of God), as she was flying through a forest on the island of Loire and attacking one of his young deacons. Samson calls for her to repent and convert, but she refuses and tells him she wishes to do nothing but evil as she did her whole life. After that Theomacha attempts to flee, but Samson commands her to stay in place, rendering her utterly immobile in the air, and offers her last final chance but she proves to be beyond salvation. Samson then proceeds to pray for such an utterly irredeemable woman's destruction; as soon as he finishes his prayer, she drops down dead.

== Nine sisters of Avalon ==
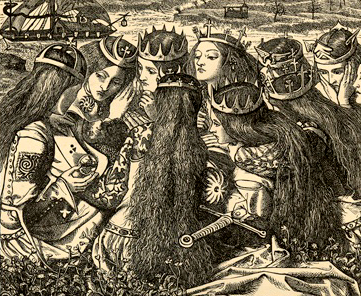
King Arthur in Avalon by Dante Gabriel Rossetti (1857)

Geoffrey of Monmouth's 12-century Vita Merlini introduces the magical island of Avalon, the paradisal "Isle of Apples", ruled by the nine benevolent enchantress sisters, known as great healers, capable of shapeshifting and performing magic spells: Morgen, Moronoe, Mazoe, Gliten, Glitonea, Gliton, Tyronoe, Thiten and Thiton, or in some sources, the last two sisters both named Thitis of whom one of them distinguished as "best known for her cither". The sisters receive the dying Arthur from Taliesin, delivered to them in a hope they can revive him. Their beautiful, wise and powerful queen, Morgen, would later evolve into Morgan le Fay, Arthur's own sister in later Arthurian tradition, who herself takes the dying Arthur to Avalon. The other eight sisters appear only in this text and never return in any known works by other medieval authors.

It is very possible that the author was inspired, besides the stories such as Preiddeu Annwfn, by an ancient Roman description of the island Sein off the coast of Brittany, depicted by the 1st century geographer Pomponius Mela as being ruled by nine virgin priestesses wielding incredible magic powers. Other possible connections involve the Greek mythology figures of Circe, Medea, and the nine muses (most of the sisters have Greek-style names).

== Nine witches of Caer Lloyw ==
The nine make their final written appearance in the Peredur son of Efrawg part of the Mabinogion, wherein Peredur (a variant of Percival) faces many opponents throughout the course of the story. However, his real enemies are eventually revealed as the Gwiddonod Caerloyw - the malignant Nine Witches of Caer Lloyw (or Caerloyw, literally the Castle of Glow in English, or the "Shining Fortress", later identified as Gloucester), also known as the Nine Sorceresses of Gloucester. Here they are fearsome mistresses of warfare and magic who terrorize Britain and whose evil deeds are responsible for ravaging his uncle's kingdom. It is a variant of an Arthurian Grail tale in which, instead of questing for the Grail, the hero takes part in ridding the land of the plague (gormes) of evil witches that must be destroyed. The witches, a group of black-clad "maiden-hags", actually enter the story as Peredur's opponents-turned-benefactors, even giving him the same powers as they have when he spends time in their home, but the central theme is his eventual unenthusiastic revenge on them for having previously harmed his relatives. Peredur himself vanquishes only the chief witch, and only forced to do so after giving them three chances to yield, but this act breaks the magic of their spells and Arthur and his men slaughter the rest without mercy and with such swiftness that not a single one escapes alive.

Relatively early on during his adventures, Peredur comes upon a mountain castle, the lady of which tells him how the surrounding lands have been conquered and laid to waste by the terrifying nine sorceresses, with powers too great for anyone to stop them, and that one is coming to take the castle the very next morning. But Peredur offers to help, and at dawn he fiercely attacks and subdues the arriving enchantress with a blow that shatters her helmet. He is just about to slay her but stops when she begs forgiveness; after obtaining permission from the lady of the castle, he agrees to spare her life if she promises to return to her land and that she and her sisters would never trouble the dominion of his hostess (Peredur regularly gives quarter to his defeated enemies through the course of the tale, including Kai and various other knights). He then sets off with the now befriended sorceress back to her palace at Caer Lloyw in the journey that itself is not described. Peredur stays at the Witches' Court (Llys Gwiddonod) for three weeks, being tutored by them until he finishes his training, and then he is sent off by their lady principal on his way with the horse and weapons of his choice.

During the grand finale at the original (Note: The entire tale of Peredur ends either with the massacre of the witches or with Peredur's marriage to the Empress of Constantinople (a later addition), depending on the manuscript.) end of the tale, however, Peredur learns that a mysterious severed head (replacing the Grail in this story), which he had witnessed before meeting the sorceresses, belonged to one his cousins. His foster-sister accuses the witches for the murder of his cousin and for having cursed and lamed his uncle (an unnamed king of the realm, here a Fisher King figure), and tells Peredur that he is predestined to be their avenger. Peredur and his elder companion Gwalchmei (Gawain) decide to summon Arthur's warband to join them in this labour, and he leads them to Caer Lloyw to deal with the sorceresses. During the ensuing showdown, the witches attack and Peredur watches the seemingly invincible leader of the enchantresses defeat Arthur's warriors one by one, as Peredur keeps pleading for her to desist and stop the fighting and give up but she does not listen; only after she kills the third one, Peredur finally enters the strife himself and swiftly strikes her down with a single powerful blow. With her dying breath, she cries out to the other witches they are doomed as Peredur was prophesied as the slayer of them all, and orders the other witches to get away; however Arthur and the others rush and chase after the fleeing women until every last one is overtaken and put to the sword.

The narrative does not actually say how many witches are gathered for the final battle at Caer Loyw when they are wiped out, and there might be more than the nine from the first encounter between them and Peredur; according to John Rhys it is suggested "they must have mustered in a great force," possibly along with (unmentioned) "numerous allies of the other sex." In any case, Peredur's duty of vengeance was fulfilled and he is celebrated as hero for his role in freeing the kingdom of the great scourge of witchcraft — and, with the sorceresses now annihilated, Peredur himself becomes the last keeper of their magic secrets. However, what happened to his uncle after the victory is left untold. Urban T. Holmes Jr. assumed that with the witches' death the king was freed from their enchantments, conversely Arthur Edward Waite assumed that the king was not healed and it was all in vain.

As in the cases of the above stories of Samson and Cai, this romance may be an echo of an otherwise unrecorded extermination of local Celtic pagan cults by Christians during the 5th and 6th centuries, as it is considered by Flint F. Johnson; Dhira B. Mahoney speculated the witches may "represent the supporters of an older order trying to regain control of the system." Elsewhere in the Mabinogion, the tale of Culhwch and Olwen likewise features the motif of Arthur's attack on Caer Loyw, but in this case the defenders of the castle are male. Arthur also hunts down Orddu (the Black Witch) and kills her by slicing her in half after she repeatedly beats his men who first struggle to defeat her, reminiscent of how Peredur dispatched of the witch queen of Caer Lloyw. Furthermore, parts of the story parallel how the Irish mythological hero Cú Chulainn is taught combat by the warrior woman Scáthach after he overcomes and threatens her; Cú Chulainn also defeats Scáthach's rival Aífe, sparing her life but raping her, and many years later comes to fight and kill their son of this union. Norma Lorre Goodrich connects the motif with "magical warrior rites in Scotland" and links the witches' leader to the figure of Queen Morgan le Fay, a sorcerous half-sister of Arthur. According to Roger Sherman Loomis, it is possible that the author either indeed had Morgan in mind for the gwiddon or that both he and Geoffrey were taking from the same sources in earlier tradition.

== Popular culture ==
- The Nine Sisters appear in Rosemary Sutcliff's novel Sword at Sunset.
- The story of the Nine Witches of Caer Lloyw (neuf sorcières de Kaer-Loyw) is depicted in Peredur, the seventh volume of the graphic novel series Arthur written by David Chauvel and illustrated by Jérôme Lereculey.
- "Tyronoe – one of the eight sisters of Morgan le Fay" is a boss character to be featured in the upcoming video game Tides of Annihilation.

== See also ==
- The number nine in culture and mythology
- Nine mothers of Heimdallr
