= Prydwen =

Mythical ship of King Arthur

Prydwen is a ship in Arthurian legend. It plays a part in the early Welsh poem Preiddeu Annwfn, in which it bears King Arthur to the Welsh otherworld Annwn, while in Culhwch and Olwen, he sails in it on expeditions to Ireland. The 12th-century chronicler Geoffrey of Monmouth named Arthur's shield after it. In the early modern period Welsh folklore preferred to give Arthur's ship the name Gwennan. Prydwen has however made a return during the last century in several Arthurian works of fiction.

== Preiddeu Annwfn ==
Arthur's ship makes an early appearance in Preiddeu Annwfn ("The Spoils of Annwn"), a Welsh mythological poem of uncertain date (possibly as early as the 9th century or as late as the 12th) preserved in the Book of Taliesin. The meaning of the poem is in many places obscure, but it seems to describe a voyage in Pridwen to Annwn, the Celtic otherworld, to rescue a prisoner held there. It includes two lines translated by John K. Bollard as

Three shiploads of Prydwen we went to it;
except for seven, none returned from Caer Siddi.

And again later

Three shiploads of Pridwen we went with Arthur;
except for seven, none returned from Caer Goludd.

A more literal translation of the first phrase is "three fullnesses of Prydwen", but it is not clear whether we are to understand this as representing three voyages by Prydwen, a single voyage of a threefold-overloaded Prydwen, or a flotilla of three ships each of which contains as many men as would fill Prydwen.

== Culhwch and Olwen ==
Prydwen appears in three episodes of the tale Culhwch and Olwen, which reached its final form c. 1080–1100. First Arthur goes to sea in Prydwen in an attempt to capture the bitch Rhymhi and her cubs. Then he and a small force sail in Prydwen to Ireland, take the cauldron of Diwrnach as booty, and sail back to Wales. Finally Arthur and all the warriors of Britain return to Ireland in search of the boar Twrch Trwyth, and when the boar and his piglets swim to Wales they follow him in Prydwen.

== Geoffrey of Monmouth ==
In Geoffrey of Monmouth's Historia Regum Britanniae, written in the 1130s, he listed Arthur's weapons, giving his shield the name Pridwen. His reason for doing that is uncertain, but it may be that he thought a name meaning "fair face" was appropriate for a shield which, he says, was adorned with an image of the Virgin Mary. It has also been suggested that Prydwen, as a magical object in Welsh tradition, could be both a shield and a ship.

== In popular tradition ==
Further evidence for the early existence of the Prydwen tradition comes from a document in the 12th-century Liber Landavensis which records the place-name messur pritguenn, "the Measure of Prydwen".

In one 16th-century manuscript (BL, Add. MS. 14866) Caswennan, the name of a sandbank in Gwynedd, is glossed as "a place hateful to ships, near Bardsey and Llŷn; there Arthur's ship named Gwennan was wrecked". In 1742 the hydrographer and antiquary Lewis Morris found that the same tradition was still current in that locality. The poet Evan Evans repeated this story in 1764, but made Caswennan the name of the ship. Iolo Morganwg (1747–1826), antiquarian and forger, listed seven of the ships belonging to King Arthur which "conveyed the saints to Ynys Enlli". He included Gwennan but not Prydwen; the other six names were purely fanciful. In other sources the ship Gwennan Gorn, wrecked on Caswennan, is said to have belonged not to King Arthur but to prince Madog ab Owain Gwynedd.

== Modern appearances ==
John Masefield's poem "The Sailing of Hell Race", in his Midsummer Night and Other Tales in Verse (1928), tells a story based on Preiddeu Annwfn, though Arthur's ship is here called Britain. Alan Lupack surmises that this is a play on the names Prydwen and Prydain, the Welsh name for Britain.

In H. Warner Munn's 1939 novel King of the World's Edge Arthur and companions cross the Atlantic in Prydwen. Susan Cooper's Silver on the Tree (1977), the last of her five Arthurian novels for children, ends with King Arthur sailing into the beyond in his ship Pridwen. Guy Gavriel Kay's novel The Wandering Fire (1986), the second of his Fionavar Tapestry sequence, features Prydwen in another quest for a magical cauldron; the third and final novel, The Darkest Road (1986), ends as Prydwen carries Arthur, Guinevere and Lancelot away over unearthly seas. In Patricia Kennealy-Morrison's The Hedge of Mist (1996), the last novel in a science-fiction Arthurian trilogy, Prydwen is one of Arthur's spaceships.

Heather Dale's song "The Prydwen Sails Again", on her 1999 album The Trial of Lancelot, again puts Prydwen into the context of the voyage to Caer Siddi.

In the post-apocalyptic videogame Fallout 4, the Brotherhood of Steel operate from a dieselpunk airship named the Prydwen, and when the player asks about the name, they are told that Elder Arthur Maxson took the name from "a work of historical fictional [...] about a man destined to become a king, and his journey to liberate his people from tyranny and oppression."

In the Arthurian historical-fiction novel The Retreat to Avalon by Sean Poage, Arthur's ship is a Late-Roman galley called Prydwen.

== See also ==
- Argo, a ship from the Greek mythology
- Flying Dutchman, a legendary ghost ship
- Mendam Berahi, the legendary ship of Malacca Sultanate
- Takarabune, a mythical ship of Japanese folklore

== Sources ==
- Bartrum, Peter C. (2009). "A Welsh Classical Dictionary: People in History and Legend up to about A.D. 1000". The National Library of Wales.
- Howey, Ann F.; Reimer, Stephen R., eds. (2006). A Bibliography of Modern Arthuriana, 1500–2000. Cambridge: D. S. Brewer. ISBN 1843840685.
- Lupack, Alan (2007) [2005]. The Oxford Guide to Arthurian Literature and Legend. Oxford: Oxford University Press. ISBN 9780199215096.
