= Pridwen =

Mythical shield of King Arthur

Pridwen was, according to the 12th-century writer Geoffrey of Monmouth, King Arthur's shield; it was adorned with an image of the Virgin Mary. Geoffrey's description of it draws on earlier Welsh traditions found in Preiddeu Annwfn, Culhwch and Olwen, and the Historia Brittonum. The shield is also named and described by Wace, Layamon, Roger of Wendover and Robert of Gloucester among other medieval writers, and it directly inspired the description of Sir Gawain's shield in Sir Gawain and the Green Knight.

== Geoffrey of Monmouth ==
King Arthur's shield Pridwen appears in the 1130s in Geoffrey of Monmouth's largely fictitious Historia Regum Britanniae. Before fighting a battle near Bath, in Somerset, Arthur

lorica tanto rege digna indutus, auream galeam simulacro draconis insculptam capiti adaptat, humeris quoque suis clipeum uocabulo Pridwen, in quo imago sanctae Mariae Dei genitricis inpicta ipsum in memoriam ipsius saepissime reuocabat. Accinctus etiam Caliburno gladio optimo et in insula Auallonis fabricato, lancea dextram suam decorat, quae nomine Ron uocabatur.

Translation:

donned a hauberk worthy of a mighty king, placed on his head a golden helmet engraved with the image of a dragon and shouldered his shield called Pridwen, on which was depicted Mary, the Holy Mother of God, to keep her memory always before his eyes. He also buckled on Caliburnus, an excellent blade forged on the isle of Avallon, and graced his hand with his spear, called Ron.

Pridwen was the name of King Arthur's shield. The name was taken from Welsh tradition, Arthur's ship in Preiddeu Annwfn and Culhwch and Olwen being called Prydwen; it was perhaps borrowed by Geoffrey because of its appropriateness to a picture of the Virgin Mary as "white face", "fair face", "blessed form" or "precious and white". The list of weapons finds a parallel in Culhwch and Olwen, where Arthur swears by his shield Wynebgwrthucher (perhaps meaning "face of evening"), his spear Rhongomiant, his knife Carnwennan, and his sword Caledfwlch. The motif of the Virgin Mary's image was taken by Geoffrey from the 9th-century Historia Brittonum, which describes a battle "in the castle of Guinnion, in which Arthur carried the image of saint Mary the perpetual virgin on his shoulders". In transferring it to Arthur's shield Geoffrey created the first example in all literature of religious symbolism on a shield.

== The Brut tradition ==
In the Roman de Brut, the Norman poet Wace's expanded translation of Geoffrey's Historia, the shield's name is given as Priven. He interprets Geoffrey's words as meaning that the representation of the Virgin was inside the shield, not outside as a heraldic device, and he assures us that bearing the shield Arthur ne sembla pas cuart ne fol, "didn't seem cowardly or crazy".

In Layamon's Brut the shield's name is again Pridwen, and he tells us that inside it the image of the Virgin Mary was igrauen mid rede golde stauen, "engraved with red gold stencilling". Elsewhere he adds the detail that Arthur's shield was made of olifantes bane, "elephant ivory".

The Gesta Regum Britanniae, a 13th-century Latin versification of Geoffrey's Historia attributed to William of Rennes, differs from earlier versions in representing the picture of the Virgin Mary as being on the outside of the shield after the manner of a heraldic blazon.

In the later 13th century the Chronicle of Robert of Gloucester, another heir of the Brut tradition, mentioned Arthur's shield (under the name þridwen) along with its Marian image.

== Other medieval literature ==
In the 1190s the churchman Gerald of Wales, mentioning Arthur's shield without naming it in his De principis instructione, added the detail that Arthur would kiss the feet of the image of the Virgin Mary before going into battle.

Pridwen was named as the shield of King Arthur in the chronicle called Flores Historiarum, both in the original version written by Roger of Wendover and in the adaptation by Matthew Paris.

13th century elaborations on the tradition of Arthur's shield recorded in the Vatican recension of the Historia Brittonum tell us that this image was brought back from Jerusalem by Arthur.

In imitation of King Arthur's Pridwen the 14th-century Middle English poem Sir Gawain and the Green Knight has its hero Gawain paint the Virgin Mary inside his shield, so that quen he blusched þerto, his belde neuer payred, "when he looked thereto, his heart never lessened".

== Sources ==
- Curley, Michael J. (1994). Geoffrey of Monmouth. Twayne's English Authors Series No. 509. New York: Twayne. ISBN 0805770550.
- Lawman (1992). Brut. Translated by Allen, Rosamund. London: J. M. Dent. ISBN 0460860720.
- Morris, Rosemary (1982). The Character of King Arthur in Medieval Literature. Arthurian Studies IV. Woodbridge: D. S. Brewer. ISBN 9780859910880.
