= Cad Goddeu =

Medieval Welsh poem

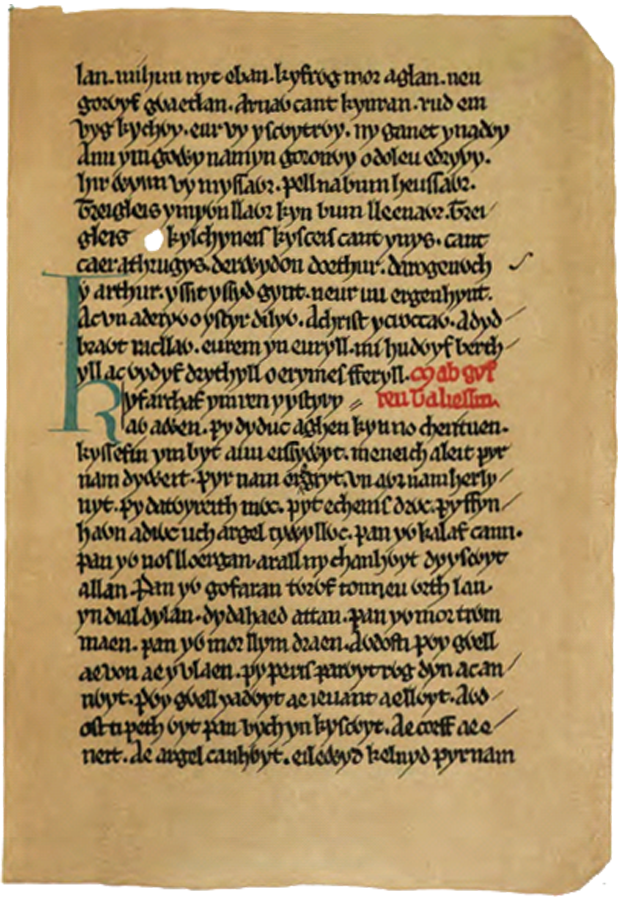

Cad Goddeu (Middle Welsh: Kat Godeu, English: "The Battle of the Trees") is a medieval Welsh poem preserved in the 14th-century manuscript known as the Book of Taliesin. The poem refers to a traditional story in which the legendary enchanter Gwydion animates the trees of the forest to fight as his army. The poem is especially notable for its striking and enigmatic symbolism and the wide variety of interpretations this has occasioned.

== Poem ==
Some 248 short lines long (usually five syllables and a rest), and falling into several sections, the poem begins with an extended claim of first-hand knowledge of all things, in a fashion found later in the poem and also in several others attributed to Taliesin;

Bum cledyf yn aghat
Bum yscwyt yg kat
Bum tant yn telyn.

Translation:

I was a sword in hand
I was a shield in battle
I was a string on a harp.

culminating in a claim to have been at "Caer Vevenir" when the Lord of Britain did battle. There follows an account of a great monstrous beast, of the fear of the Britons and how, by Gwydion's skill and the grace of God, the trees marched to battle: then follows a list of plants, each with some outstanding attribute, now apt, now obscure;

Gwern blaen llin,
A want gysseuin
Helyc a cherdin
Buant hwyr yr vydin.

Translation:

Alder, front of the line,
formed the vanguard
Willow and Rowan
were late to the fray.

The poem then breaks into a first-person account of the birth of the flower-maiden Blodeuwedd, and then the history of another one, a great warrior, once a herdsman, now a learned traveller, perhaps Arthur or Taliesin himself. After repeating an earlier reference to the Flood, the Crucifixion and the day of judgment, the poem closes with an obscure reference to metalwork.

== Interpretations ==
There are contemporary passing allusions to the Battle of Trees elsewhere in the medieval Welsh collections: The Welsh Triads record it as a "frivolous" battle, while in another poem of the Book of Taliesin the poet claims to have been present at the battle.

According to a summary of a similar story preserved in Peniarth MS 98B (which dates from the late sixteenth century) the poem describes a battle between Gwydion and Arawn, the Lord of Annwn. The fight broke out after the divine plowman Amaethon stole a dog, a lapwing, and a roebuck from Arawn. Gwydion ultimately triumphed by guessing the name of one of Arawn's men, Bran (possibly Bran the Blessed).

In the Mabinogi story of the childhood of Lleu Llaw Gyffes, Gwydion makes a forest appear to be an invading force.

The Cad Goddeu, which is difficult to translate because of its laconic allusiveness and grammatical ambiguity, was the subject of several nineteenth-century speculative commentaries and English renderings. Thomas Stephens held the poem to concern "a Helio-Arkite superstition, the metempsychosis of a Chief Druid, and a symbolical account of the Deluge". Gerald Massey's monumental work on African origins suggested that the poem reflected Egyptian religion.

David William Nash believed it was a poor-quality twelfth-century romance overlaying a romance or story of the Arthurian era and put together with other poetic fragments. W. F. Skene rejected the antiquity of the prose account and thought the poem reflected the history of the north country during the Irish incursions. Watson followed Skene and Ifor Williams posed the question 'What about the Battle of Celyddon Wood?'

Robert Graves took up a speculation that had been considered and rejected by Nash; that the trees that fought in the battle correspond to the Ogham alphabet, in which each character is associated with a particular tree. Each tree had a meaning and significance of its own, and Gwydion guessed Bran's name by the alder branch Bran carried, the alder being one of Bran's prime symbols. Graves argued that the original poet had concealed druidic secrets about an older matriarchal Celtic religion for fear of censure from Christian authorities. He suggested that Arawn and Bran were names for the same underworld god and that the battle was probably not physical but rather a struggle of wits and scholarship: Gwydion's forces could only be defeated if the name of his companion, Lady Achren ("Trees"), was guessed and Arawn's host only if Bran's name was guessed.

Graves, following Nash, accepted that the poem is a composite of several different sections, among which he named a Hanes Taliesin (History of Taliesin) and a Hanes Blodeuwedd (History of Blodeuwedd).

Marged Haycock and Mary Ann Constantine reject the idea that Cad Goddeu encodes ancient pagan religions as Graves believed but rather see it as a burlesque, a grand parody of bardic language. Francesco Bennozo argues that the poem represents ancient fears of the forest and its magical powers. Trudy Carmany Last suggests that Cad Goddeu is a Celtic variant of Virgil’s Aeneid.

== Other uses ==
A track titled "Cad Goddeau" appears on the 1984 album Eostre by the British band Zoviet France.

Singer-songwriter Tori Amos was inspired by the story of Cad Goddeu for her song "Battle of Trees", which appears on Night of Hunters, a narrative concept album, presented as a 21st-century song cycle. This song, a variation on Erik Satie's Gnossienne No. 1, uses references to Cad Goddeu to reflect on the power of language as a battle-ready weapon.

Soviet and later Russian rock group Aquarium recorded a song "Kad Goddo" on their album Deti Dekabrya, 1986, quoting some of the lines directly from the poem.

Tim Powers has the protagonist of his book The Drawing of the Dark, Brian Duffy, utter a few verses of the Cad Goddeu to evoke ancient beings to fight with him.

"Duel of the Fates" is a musical theme recurring in the Star Wars prequel trilogy and the expanded universe. It was composed by John Williams and recorded for the film soundtrack by the London Symphony Orchestra and the London Voices. This symphonic piece is played with both a full orchestra and a choir. The lyrics are based on a fragment of Cad Goddeu, and sung in Sanskrit.

== See also ==
- Preiddeu Annwfn
