= Preiddeu Annwfn =

Medieval Welsh poem

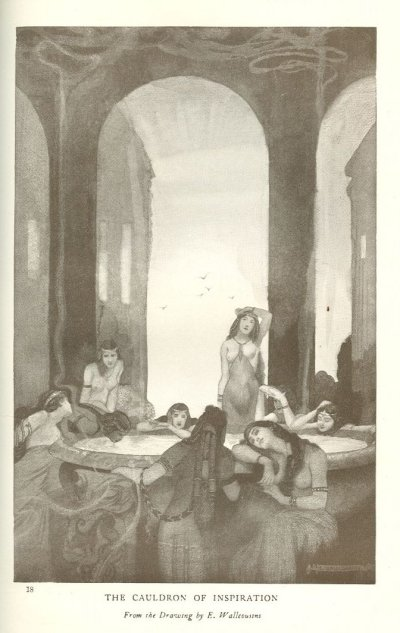
Image by E. Wallcousins, 1912. "In Caer Pedryvan, four its revolutions; In the first word from the cauldron when spoken, From the breath of nine maidens it was gently warmed".

Preiddeu Annwfn or Preiddeu Annwn (English: The Spoils of Annwfn) is a cryptic poem of sixty lines in Middle Welsh, found in the Book of Taliesin. The text recounts an expedition with King Arthur to Annwfn or Annwn, the Otherworld in Welsh.

Preiddeu Annwfn is one of the best known medieval British poems. English translations, in whole or in part, have been published by R. Williams (in William Forbes Skene's Four Ancient Books of Wales), by Robert Graves in The White Goddess and by Roger Sherman Loomis, Herbert Pilch, John T. Koch, Marged Haycock, John K. Bollard, Sarah Higley. At points it requires individual interpretation on the part of its translators owing to its terse style, the ambiguities of its vocabulary, its survival in a single copy of doubtful reliability, the lack of exact analogues of the tale it tells and the host of real or fancied resonances with other poems and tales.

A number of scholars (in particular, Marshall H. James, who points out the remarkable similarity in Line 1, of Verse 2 in "Mic Dinbych", from the Black Book of Carmarthen) have pointed out analogues in other medieval Welsh literature: some suggest that it represents a tradition that evolved into the grail of Arthurian literature. Haycock (in The Figure of Taliesin) says that the poem is "about Taliesin and his vaunting of knowledge", and Higley calls the poem "a metaphor of its own making—a poem about the material 'spoils' of poetic composition".

== Manuscript and date ==
The poem is uniquely preserved in the Book of Taliesin (Aberystwyth, NLW, MS Peniarth 2), which has been dated to the first quarter of the 14th century. The text of the poem itself has proved immensely difficult to date. Estimates range from the time of the bard Taliesin in the late 6th century to that of the completion of the manuscript. On the basis of linguistic criteria Norris J. Lacy suggests that the poem took its present form around AD 900. Marged Haycock notes that the poem shares a formal peculiarity with a number of pre-Gogynfeirdd poems found in the Book of Taliesin, that is, the caesura usually divides the lines into a longer and shorter section. She contends, however, that there is no firm linguistic evidence that the poem predates the time of the Gogynfeirdd.

== Text ==
The poem may be divided into eight stanzas, each for the most part united by a single rhyme but with irregular numbers of lines. The first stanza begins and the last ends with two lines of praise to the Lord, generally taken to be Christian. In the last couplet of each stanza except the last the speaker mentions a dangerous journey into Annwfn with Arthur and three boat-loads of men, of whom only seven returned, presumably with the "spoils" from Annwfn. Annwfn is apparently referred to by several names, including "Mound or Fairy Fortress," "Four Peaked or Cornered Fortress," and "Glass Fortress", though it is possible these are intended to be distinct. Whatever tragedy occurred is not clearly explained.

Each stanza except the last two begins in the first person; the first begins "I praise the Lord", the second and third "I am honoured in praise", the next three declare "I do not merit little men" who rely on books and lack understanding. The last two refer to crowds of monks who again rely upon the words and the knowledge of authorities and lack the type of experience the poem claims.

Between these beginnings and ends the first six stanzas offer brief allusions to the journey. In the first Gweir is encountered imprisoned in the fort's walls, a character whom Rachel Bromwich associates with Gwair, one of "Three Exalted Prisoners of Britain" known from the Welsh Triads. He is imprisoned in chains, apparently until Judgment Day, singing before the spoils of Annwfn. The second stanza describes the cauldron of the Chief of Annwn, finished with pearl, and how it was taken, presumably being itself the "spoils". The third and fourth allude to difficulties with the forces of Annwfn while the fifth and sixth describe a great ox, also richly decorated, that may also form part of Arthur's spoils.

The first stanza has already mentioned Pwyll, the legendary prince of Dyfed who in the first branch of the Mabinogi becomes the Chief of Annwfn after helping its king, Arawn, and was credited with ownership of a cauldron.

The speaker may be intended to be Taliesin himself, for the second stanza says "my poetry, from the cauldron it was uttered, from the breath of nine maidens it was kindled, the cauldron of the chief of Annwfyn" and Taliesin's name is connected to a similar story in the legend of his birth. Song is heard in the fourfold fort, which therefore seems also to be Annwfn: Gweir was imprisoned in perpetual song before a cauldron that first gave out poetry when breathed upon by nine maidens, reminiscent of the nine muses of classical thought. Just as, we are told, the cauldron "does not boil the food of a coward", so the song it is inspires is "honoured in praise", too good for petty men of ordinary mentality.

== Analogues and interpretations ==
Two works in particular, the tale of Bran the Blessed in the Second Branch of the Mabinogi and a tale included in Culhwch and Olwen in which Arthur's retinue sail to Ireland aboard Prydwen (the ship used in Preiddeu) to obtain the Cauldron of Diwrnach, are frequently cited as narratives resembling that of the present poem.

=== Bran and Branwen ===
In the Second Branch Bran gives his magic life-restoring cauldron to his new brother-in-law Matholwch of Ireland when he marries Bran's sister Branwen. Matholwch mistreats his new wife and Bran's men cross the Irish Sea to rescue her. This attack involves the destruction of the cauldron, which Matholwch uses to resuscitate his soldiers. There is a battle between the hosts and in the end only seven of Bran's men escape alive, including Taliesin and Pryderi.

=== Arthur and Diwrnach ===
In Culhwch and Olwen Arthur's retinue also sail to Ireland (aboard his ship Prydwen, the ship used in Preiddeu) to obtain the cauldron which, like that in Preiddeu Annwfn, would never boil meat for a coward whereas it would boil quickly if meat for a brave man were put in it. Arthur's warrior Llenlleawc the Irishman seizes Caledfwlch (Excalibur) and swings it around, killing Diwrnach's entire retinue. Taliesin is mentioned in Culhwch among Arthur's retinue, as are several Gweirs.

Preiddeu Annwfn is usually understood to say that a sword described either as "bright" or else "of Lleawch" was raised to the cauldron, leaving it in the hands of "Lleminawc" (cledyf lluch lleawc idaw rydyrchit/ Ac yn llaw leminawc yd edewit). Some scholars have found the similarity to this Llenlleawc compelling, but the evidence is not conclusive. Higley suggests a common story has influenced these various Welsh and Irish accounts.

=== Annwfn ===
Sir John Rhys was quick to connect these campaigns in Ireland with the symbolic "western isles" of the Celtic otherworld and, in this general sense, Preiddeu Annfwn may be associated with the maritime adventure genres of Immram and Echtra. Rhys also noted that the Isle of Lundy was once known as Ynys Wair, and suggested that it was once accounted the place of Gweir's imprisonment.

Culhwch also recounts Arthur's nearby rescue of another of the three famous prisoners, Mabon ap Modron, a god of poetry after whom the Mabinogi are named, and gives details of another ruler of Annwfn, Gwynn ap Nudd, king of the Tylwyth Teg - the fairies in Welsh lore - "whom God has placed over the brood of devils in Annwn lest they should destroy the present race". Gwynn is also made part of Arthur's retinue, though he is the son of a god, after Arthur intervenes in his dispute over Creiddylad.

In the First Branch of the Mabinogi Pwyll marries Rhiannon and their son Pryderi receives a gift of pigs from Arawn. He later follows a white boar to a mysterious tower where he is trapped by a beautiful golden bowl in an enchanted "blanket of mist" and temporarily vanishes with Rhiannon and the tower itself. This motif has also been compared with that of Gweir/Gwair's imprisonment.

Roger Sherman Loomis pointed out the similarities between Preiddeu's description of the "Glass Fortress" and a story from Irish mythology recorded in both the Book of Invasions and the 9th-century Historia Britonum, in which the Milesians, the ancestors to the Irish people, encounter a glass tower in the middle of the ocean whose inhabitants do not speak with them, just as, in Preiddeu, the Glass Fortress is defended by 6,000 men and Arthur's crew finds it difficult to speak with their sentinel. The Milesians attack and most of their force perishes.

Another fortress, "Caer Sidi", is often linked through its name with the Irish fairyland, where live the Tuatha Dé Danann, whom the Milesians eventually conquer. it appears again in the same collection, in "Kerd Veib am Llyr", ("The Song of the Sons of Llyr"), in language that closely follows that of Preiddeu; Complete is my chair in Caer Siddi/ No one will be afflicted with disease or old age that may be in it./ Manawyddan and Pryderi know it./ Three (musical?) instruments by the fire, will sing before it/ and around its borders are the streams of the ocean/ and the fruitful fountain is above it.... The poet, this time definitely speaking as Taliesin, also claims to have been with Bran in Ireland, Bran and Manawyddan being the sons of Llŷr.

Higley affirms that Annwfn is "popularly associated with the land of the old gods who can bestow gifts, including the gift of poetry (awen)". She cites another poem in the same collection, called "Angar Kyfyndawt", which states that Annwfn is in the deeps below the earth, and that "It is Awen I sing, / from the deep I bring it". The great ox has "seven score links on his collar" while in "Angar Kyfyndawt" awen has "seven score ogyruen“. Though this latter is not a well-understood term, it can be interpreted as - possibly - personification, attribute, characteristic or symbol.

In a third poem, "Kadeir Teyrnon", three "awens" come from the ogyruen, just as in the birth legend Taliesin receives inspiration in three drops from the cauldron of Ceridwen, the enchantress who gives a second birth to the legendary Taliesin, and who is also mentioned other poems from the collection, "Kerd Veib am Llyr" and "Kadeir Kerrituen", and by another poet, Cuhelyn, in connection with ogyruen.

These poems draw freely upon a wide variety of otherworldly tales, representing the fateful voyage, the battle, imprisonment and the cauldron as allegories of a mystical poetic knowledge beyond the ordinary. Robert Graves aligned himself personally with the poets' standpoint, commenting that literary scholars are psychologically incapable of interpreting myth

=== The Grail ===
Early translators suggested a link between Preiddeu Annwfn (taken together with the Bran story) and the later Grail narratives, with varying degrees of success. Similarities are sometimes peripheral, such as that both Bran the Blessed and the Grail keeper the Fisher King receive wounds in their legs and both dwell in a castle of delights where no time seems to pass. The graal portrayed in Chrétien de Troyes' Perceval, the Story of the Grail is taken to be reminiscent of Bran's cauldron, and, as in Preiddeu, the Grail romances always result in initial tragedy and frequently in huge loss of life.

Earlier scholars were quicker to read Celtic origins in the Holy Grail stories than their modern counterparts. Whereas early 20th-century Celtic enthusiast Jessie Weston unequivocally declared that an earlier form of the Grail narrative could be found in Preiddeu Annwfn, modern researcher Richard Barber denies Celtic myth had much influence on the legend's development at all. R. S. Loomis, however, argued that it was more logical to search for recurrent themes and imagery found in both the Grail stories and Celtic material rather than exact ancestors; many or most modern scholars share this opinion.

== Sources ==
- Barber, Richard (2004). The Holy Grail: Imagination and Belief. Harvard University Press. ISBN 978-0-674-01390-2. Archived from the original on 12 May 2004.
- Bollard, John K. (translator) (2013). "Arthur in the Early Welsh Tradition" in The Romance of Arthur, Norris J. Lacy and James J. Wilhelm, eds. London: Routledge. ISBN 978-0-415-78288-3.
- Bromwich, Rachel (2006). Trioedd Ynys Prydein: The Triads of the Island of Britain. Cardiff: University of Wales. ISBN 0-7083-1386-8.
- Gantz, Jeffrey (translator) (1987). The Mabinogion. New York: Penguin. ISBN 0-14-044322-3.
- Haycock, Marged (1983-4). "Preiddeu Annwn and the Figure of Taliesin." Studia Celtica 18-9. pp. 52–78.
- Higley, Sarah. "Preiddeu Annwfn: 'The Spoils of Annwn'". The Camelot Project. Archived from the original on 9 April 2014.
- Lacy, Norris J. (Ed.) (1991). The New Arthurian Encyclopedia. New York: Garland. ISBN 0-8240-4377-4.
- Loomis, Roger Sherman (1991). The Grail: From Celtic Myth to Christian Symbol. Princeton. ISBN 978-0-691-02075-4.
