= Avalon =

Legendary island featured in Arthurian legend

- Matter of Britain location
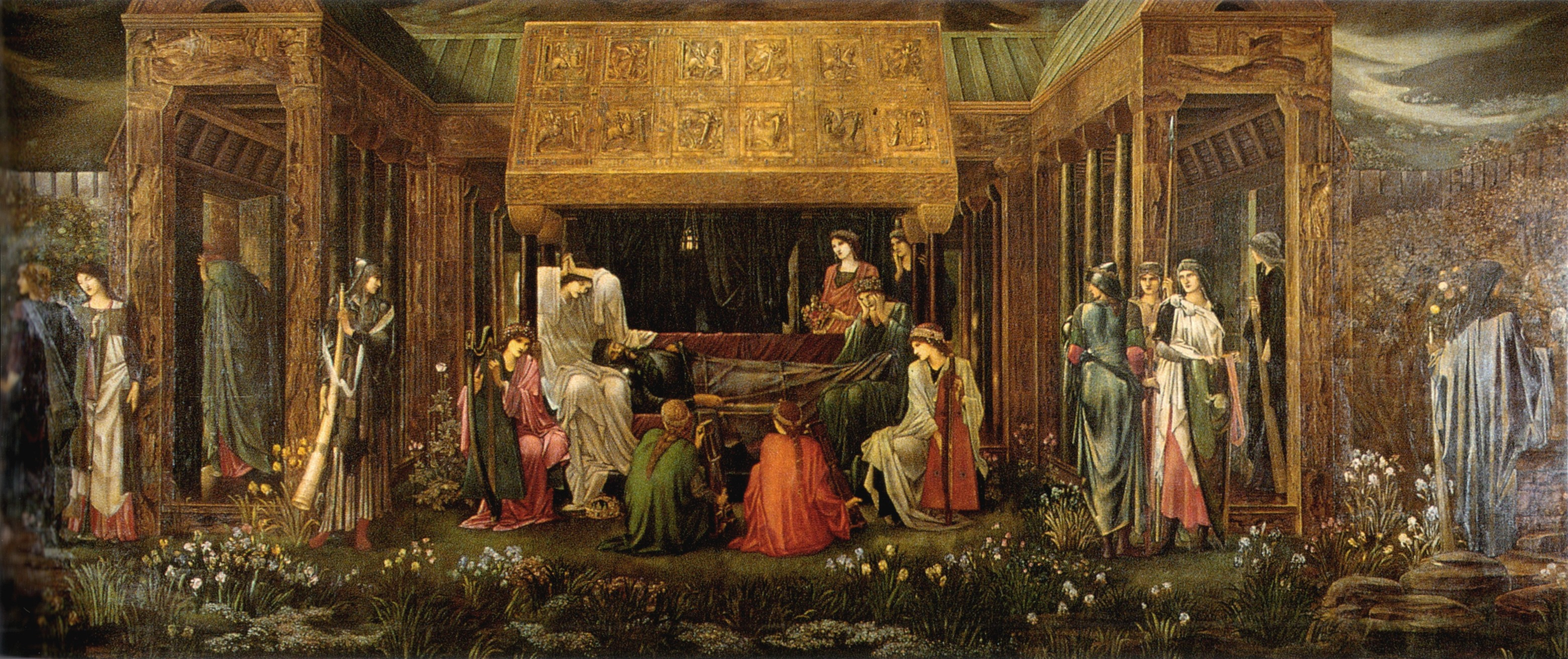
- The Last Sleep of Arthur in Avalon by Edward Burne-Jones
- First appearance: Historia Regum Britanniae
- Based on: Disputed origins

In-universe information
- Type: Fairyland island (typically)
- Ruled by: Morgan (usually)
- Location: Varied or unspecified; sometimes an otherworld
- Characters: King Arthur, Lady of the Lake, nine sisters, Melusine, Ogier the Dane

Avalon (/ˈævəlɒn/) (Note: Latin: Insula Avallonis; Welsh: Ynys Afallon, Ynys Afallach ("the isle of apple [or fruit] trees"). Sometimes also written Avallon or Avilion among various other spellings.) is an island featured in the Arthurian legend. It first appeared in Geoffrey of Monmouth's 1136 Historia Regum Britanniae as a place of magic where King Arthur's sword Excalibur was made and later where Arthur was taken to recover from being gravely wounded at the Battle of Camlann. Since then, the island has become a symbol of Arthurian mythology, similar to Arthur's castle, Camelot.

Avalon was associated from an early date with mystical practices and magical figures such as King Arthur's sorceress sister Morgan, cast as the island's ruler by Geoffrey and many later authors. Certain Cornish and Welsh traditions have maintained that Arthur is an eternal king who had never truly died but would return as the "once and future" king. The particular motif of his rest in Morgan's care in Avalon has become especially popular. It can be found in various versions in many French and other medieval Arthurian and other works written in the wake of Geoffrey, some of them also linking Avalon with the legend of the Holy Grail.

Avalon has often been identified as the former island of Glastonbury Tor. An early and long-standing belief involves the purported discovery of Arthur's remains and their later grand reburial, in accordance with the medieval English tradition in which Arthur did not survive the fatal injuries he suffered in his final battle. Besides Glastonbury, several other alternative locations of Avalon have also been claimed or proposed. Many medieval sources also localized the place in Sicily, and European folklore connected it with the phenomenon of Fata Morgana.

== Etymology ==
The meaning and origin of the name Avalon have been long debated by Arthurian scholars as well as Celtic and Romance philologists. Geoffrey of Monmouth in his pseudo-chronicle Historia Regum Britanniae ("The History of the Kings of Britain", c. 1136) calls the place Insula Avallonis, meaning the "Isle of Avallon" in Latin. In his later Vita Merlini ("The Life of Merlin", c. 1150), he calls it Insula Pomorum, the "Isle of Fruit Trees" (from Latin pōmus "fruit tree"). Today, the name is generally considered to be from the Welsh afallen "apple tree, fruit tree" (from Proto-Celtic *abalnā, literally "fruit-bearing (thing)"). A Cornish or Breton origin is also possible, deriving from aball or avallen(n).

The tradition of an "apple" island among the ancient Britons may also be related to Irish legends of the otherworld island home of Manannán mac Lir and Lugh, Emain Ablach (also the Old Irish poetic name for Isle of Man), where Ablach means "Having Apple Trees"— from Old Irish aball ("apple tree") — and is similar to the Middle Welsh name Afallach, which was used to replace the name Avalon in medieval Welsh translations of French and Latin Arthurian tales. All are related to the Gaulish root *aballo- "apple tree" (found in the place name Aballo/Aballone) and are derived from Proto-Celtic *abūl "apple", which is related at the Indo-European level to English apple, Russian яблоко (jabloko), Latvian ābele, etc.

In the early 12th century, William of Malmesbury claimed the name of Avalon came from a man called Avalloc, who once lived on this isle with his daughters. Gerald of Wales similarly derived the name of Avalon from its purported former ruler, Avallo. The name is also similar to "Avallus", described by Pliny the Elder in his 1st-century Naturalis Historia as a mysterious island where amber could be found.

== Legend ==
=== Geoffrey of Monmouth ===
According to Geoffrey in the Historia, and much subsequent literature which he inspired, King Arthur was taken to Avalon (Avallon) in hope that he could be saved and recover from his mortal wounds following the tragic Battle of Camlann. Geoffrey first mentions Avalon as the place where Arthur's sword Excalibur (Caliburn) was forged.

Geoffrey dealt with the subject in more detail in the Vita Merlini, in which he describes for the first time in Arthurian legend the fairy or fae-like enchantress Morgen (i.e. Morgan) as the chief of nine sisters (including Moronoe, Mazoe, Gliten, Glitonea, Gliton, Tyronoe and Thiten) who together rule Avalon. Geoffrey's telling, in the in-story narration by the bard Taliesin to Merlin, indicates a sea voyage was needed to get there. The description of Avalon, which is heavily indebted to the early medieval Spanish scholar Isidore of Seville (having been mostly derived from the section on famous islands in Isidore's work Etymologiae, XIV.6.8 "Fortunatae Insulae"), shows the magical nature of the island:

The Isle of Fruit Trees which men call the Fortunate Isle (Insula Pomorum quae Fortunata uocatur) gets its name from the fact that it produces all things of itself; the fields there have no need of the ploughs of the farmers and all cultivation is lacking except what nature provides. Of its own accord it produces grain and grapes, and apple trees grow in its woods from the close-clipped grass. The ground of its own accord produces everything instead of merely grass, and people live there a hundred years or more. There nine sisters rule by a pleasing set of laws those who come to them from our country. (Note: By comparison, Isidore's description of the Fortunate Isles reads: "The Fortunate Isles (Fortunatarum insulae) signify by their name that they produce all kinds of good things, as if they were happy and blessed with an abundance of fruit. Indeed, well-suited by their nature, they produce fruit from very precious trees [Sua enim aptae natura pretiosarum poma silvarum parturiunt]; the ridges of their hills are spontaneously covered with grapevines; instead of weeds, harvest crops, and garden herbs are common there. Hence the mistake of pagans and the poems by worldly poets, who believed that these isles were Paradise because of the fertility of their soil. They are situated in the Ocean, against the left side of Mauretania, closest to where the sun sets, and they are separated from each other by the intervening sea." In ancient and medieval geographies and maps, the Fortunate Isles were typically identified with the Canary Islands.)

In Layamon's Brut version of the Historia, Arthur is taken to Avalon to be healed there through means of magic water by a distinctively Anglo-Saxon version of Morgen: an elf queen of Avalon named Argante. In the Didot-Perceval, Perceval's Grail Quest adventures include him fighting a flock of ravens that turn out to be fairy maidens from Avalon, sisters of the wife of one Urbain of the Black Thorn, in a story likely representing Geoffrey's shapeshifting Morgen and her sisters as inspired by the Welsh Modron (Urbain thus being Modron's husband Urien) and possibly also influenced by the Irish Mórrigan. Geoffrey's Merlin not only never visits Avalon but is not even aware of its existence, until told about it after Arthur's delivery there by Taliesin. This would change to various degrees in the later Arthurian prose romance tradition that expanded on Merlin's association with Arthur, as well on the subject of Avalon itself.

=== Later medieval literature ===
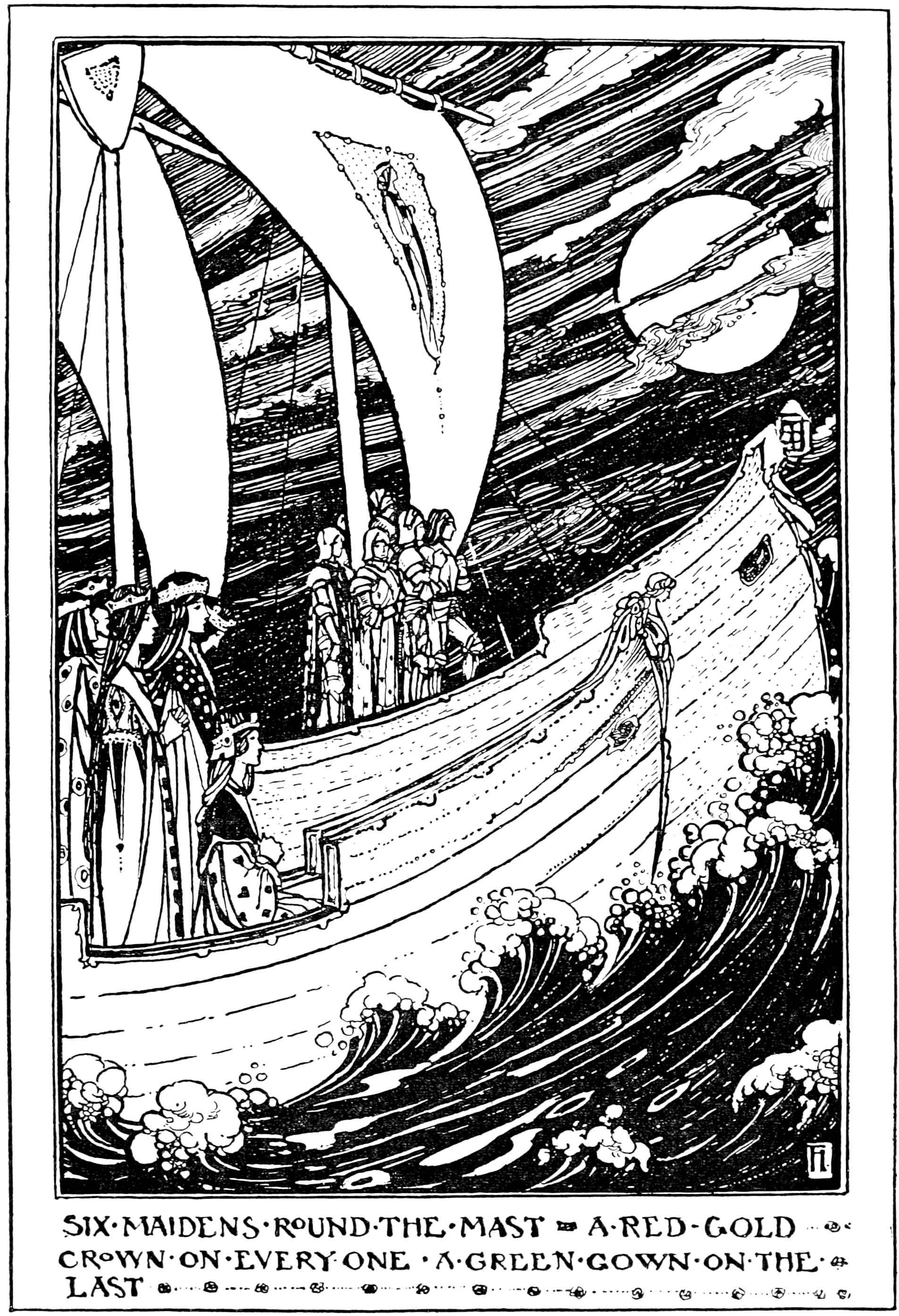
Florence Harrison's illustration for the poem "Near Avalon" by William Morris (1914)

In many versions of Arthurian legend, including Thomas Malory's compilation Le Morte d'Arthur, Morgan the Fairy and several other magical queens (numbering either three, four, or "many") arrive after the battle to take the mortally wounded Arthur from the battlefield of Camlann (Salisbury Plain in the romances) to Avalon in a black boat. Besides Morgan, who by this time had already become Arthur's supernatural sibling in the popular romance tradition, they sometimes come with the Lady of the Lake among them. The others may include the Queen of Northgales (North Wales) and the Queen of the Wasteland. In the Vulgate Queste, Morgan tells Arthur of her intention to relocate to Avalon, "where the ladies who know all the magic in the world are" (ou les dames sont qui seiuent tous les enchantemens del monde [sic]), not long before his final battle. Its Welsh version also claims, within its text, to be a translation of old Latin books from Avalon, as does the French Perlesvaus. In Lope Garcia de Salazar's Spanish summary of the Post-Vulgate Roman du Graal, Avalon is conflated with (and explicitly named as) the mythological Island of Brasil, said to be located west of Ireland and afterwards forever hidden in mist by Morgan's enchantment.

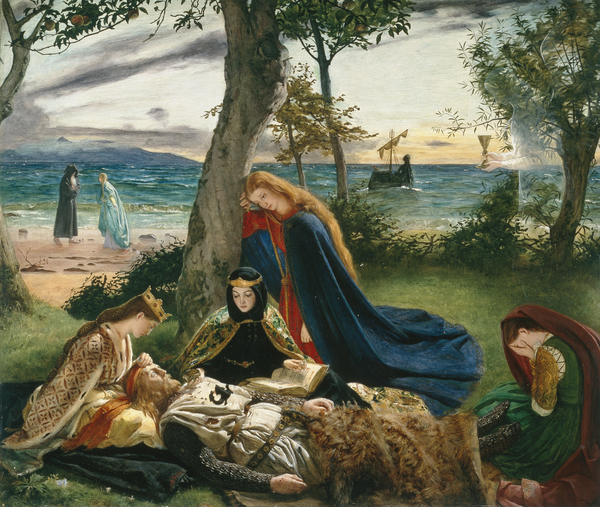
James Archer, La Mort d'Arthur (1860)

In some texts, Arthur's fate in Avalon is left untold or uncertain. In the Vera historia de morte Arthuri ("True story of the death of Arthur"), for instance, Arthur is taken by four of his men to Avalon in the land of Gwynedd (north-west Wales), where he is about to die but then mysteriously disappears in a mist amongst sudden great storm. Lanzelet tells of Arthur's son Loholt (Loüt) having left together with his father to Avalon "whence the Bretons still expect both of them evermore." Other times, Arthur's eventual death is explicitly confirmed, as it happens in the Stanzaic Morte Arthur, where the Archbishop of Canterbury later receives the dead king's body from Morgan and buries it at Glastonbury. In the telling from Alliterative Morte Arthure, relatively devoid of supernatural elements, it is not Morgan but the renowned physicians from Salerno who try, and fail, to save Arthur's life in Avalon. Conversely, the Gesta Regum Britanniae, an early rewrite of Geoffrey's Historia, states (in the present tense) that Morgan "keeps his healed body for her very own and they now live together." In a similar narrative, the chronicle Draco Normannicus contains a fictional letter from King Arthur to Henry II of England, claiming Arthur having been healed of his wounds and made immortal by his "deathless (eternal) nymph" sister Morgan in the holy island of Avalon (Avallonis eas insula sacra) through the island's miraculous herbs. This is reminiscent of the British tradition mentioned by Gervase of Tilbury as having Morgan still healing Arthur's wounds opening annually ever since on the Isle of Avalon (Davalim). In the Didot-Perceval, Arthur's sister Morgan is left to tends his mortal wounds in Avalon while the Britons wait for him (as told by him to do) for 40 years before electing another king. The author then adds that some people still hope that Arthur did not die and would return as he had promised, and tells of a legend according to which he has been seen since out hunting in the forests.

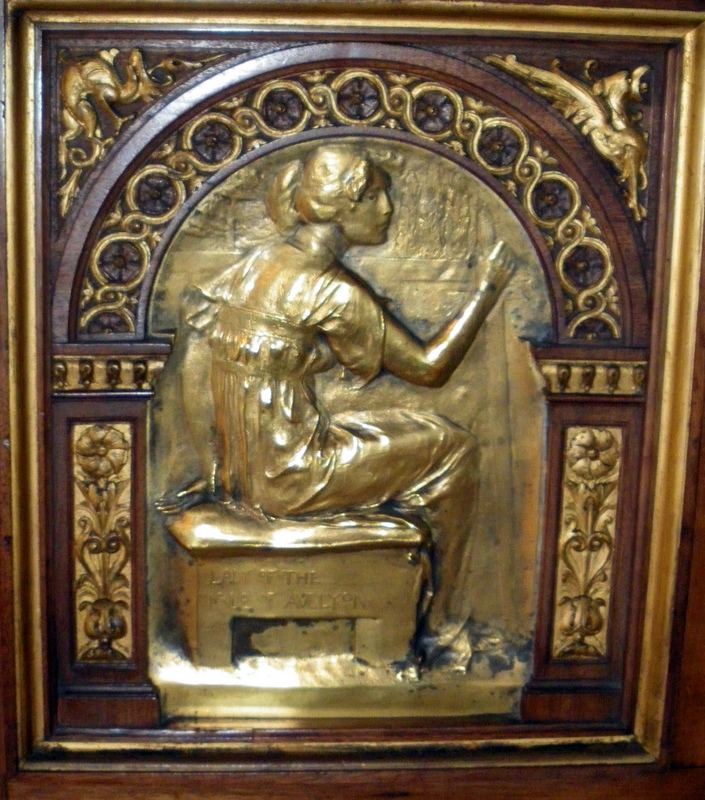
"Lady of the Isle of Avelyon", George Frampton's relief panel at 2 Temple Place in London

In Perlesvaus, the bodies of Guinevere and her young son Loholt have been already buried in Avalon by Arthur himself during his reign. Erec and Enide, an early Arthurian romance by Chrétien de Troyes, mentions at the wedding of Arthur and Guinevere a "friend" (i.e. lover) of Morgan as the Lord of the Isle of Avalon, Guingomar (manuscript variants Guinguemar, Guingamar, Guigomar, Guilemer, Gimoers). In this appearance, he might have been derived from the fairy king Gwyn ap Nudd, who in the Welsh Arthurian tradition figures as the ruler of Avalon-like Celtic Otherworld, Annwn. In Lanval by Marie de France, the protagonist's fairy lover comes from Avalon and in the end takes him there. The German Diu Crône says the Queen of Avalon is the goddess (göttin) Enfeidas, Arthur's aunt (sister of Uther Pendragon) and one of the guardians of the Grail. In Gottfried von Strassburg's Tristan, Petitcrieu is a magical dog created by a goddess in Avalon. The Venician Les Prophéties de Merlin features the character of an enchantress known only as the Lady of Avalon (Dame d'Avalon), a Merlin's apprentice who is a fierce rival of Morgan as well as of Sebile, another of Merlin's female students. In the late Italian Tavola Ritonda, the lady of the island of Avalon (dama dell'isola di Vallone, likely the same as the Lady of Avalon from the Propheties) is a fairy mother of the evil sorceress Elergia. An unnamed Lady of the Isle of Avalon (named as Lady Lyle of Avalon by Malory) appears indirectly in the Post-Vulgate Cycle story of Sir Balin in which her damsel brings a cursed magic sword to Camelot.

Avalon has been also occasionally described as a valley. In Le Morte d'Arthur, for instance, Avalon is called an isle twice and a vale once (the latter in the scene of Arthur's final voyage, oddly despite Malory's adoption of the boat travel motif). Notably, the vale of Avalon (vaus d'Avaron) is mentioned twice in Robert de Boron's Arthurian prequel Joseph d'Arimathie as a place located in western Britannia, to where a fellowship of early Christians started by Joseph of Arimathea brought the Grail after its long journey from the Holy Land, finally delivered there by Bron, the first Fisher King.

==== Escavalon ====
In his final romance, Perceval, the Story of the Grail, Chrétien de Troyes featured the sea fortress of Escavalon, ruled by the unspecified King of Escavalon. The name Escavalon might be simply a corruption of the word Avalon that can be literally translated as "Water-Avalon", albeit some scholars proposed various other developments of the name Escavalon from that of Avalon (with Roger Sherman Loomis noting the similarity of the evolution of Geoffrey's Caliburn into the Chrétien's Escalibur in the case of Excalibur), perhaps in connection with the Old French words for either Slav or Saracen. Chrétien's Escavalon was renamed as Askalon in Parzival by Wolfram von Eschenbach, who might have been either confused or inspired by the real-life Middle Eastern coastal city of Ascalon.

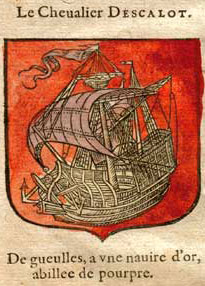
Ship-themed attributed arms of the Knight of Escalot

It is possible that the Chrétien-era Escavalon has been turned or split into the Grail realm of Escalot (Malory's Astolat) in later prose romances. Nevertheless, the kingdoms of Escalot and Escavalon both appear concurrently in the Vulgate Cycle. There, Escavalon is ruled by King Alain, whose daughter Florée is rescued by Gawain and later gives birth to his son Gingalain. The character of Alain may have been derived from Afallach (Avallach) of Avalon.

==== Post-Arthurian stories ====
Morgan features as an immortal ruler of a fantastic Avalon, sometimes alongside the still-alive Arthur, in some subsequent and otherwise non-Arthurian chivalric romances. These include Tirant lo Blanch, as well as the tales of Huon of Bordeaux, where the faery king Oberon is a son of either Morgan by name or "the Lady of the Secret Isle", and the legend of Ogier the Dane, where Avalon may be described as an enchanted fairy castle (chasteu d'Auallon), as it is also in Floriant et Florete. In his La Faula, Guillem de Torroella claims to have visited the Enchanted Island (Illa Encantada) and met Arthur who has been brought back to life by Morgan and they both of them are now forever young, sustained by the Holy Grail. In La Bataille Loquifer, Morgan and her sister Marsion bring the hero Renoart to Avalon, where Arthur now prepares his return alongside Morgan, Gawain, Ywain, Perceval and Guinevere.

Such stories, which also include Lion de Bourges, Mabrien, Tristan de Nanteuil, and others, typically take place centuries after the times of King Arthur. The tales of the half-fairy Melusine also have her grow up in the isle of Avalon.

In the wake of Huon de Bordeaux, the hero's adventure in fairyland became practically de rigueur in the later chansons de geste. These adventures are all cut from the same mould and serve a common purpose: as qualifying experiences for the hero. They allow the author to confirm in the Other World what is already manifest in this one, and often to relaunch the hero on his quest. The Arthurian world evoked is that of Avalon after Arthur's disappearance, whether or not it is explicitly named. Except in Lion de Bourges it is located vaguely in the east and sometimes upon an island. The characters are invariably Arthur and his sister Morgan, with accompanying fairies, but, except in La Bataille Loquifer and Ogier, no other Knights of the Round Table. Arthur himself assumes magical powers in these works, replacing in this sense Merlin, who is never explicitly evoked. Arthur is no longer the head of the Round Table, but the master of an ethereal kingdom populated with fairies and spirits.

— William W. Kibler, "Arthurian Ornament: Arthurian Material in Later Epic"

=== Connection to Glastonbury ===
Though no longer an island, in the 12th century the high conical rock outcrop bulk of Glastonbury Tor in today's South-West England in the town of Glastonbury (situated about 15 miles (25 kilometres) from the sea), had been surrounded by marsh before the draining of fenland in the Somerset Levels. Its earliest name in Welsh was the Isle of Glass, which suggests that the location was at one point seen as an island. At the end of the 12th century, Gerald of Wales wrote in De principis instructione:

What is now known as Glastonbury was, in ancient times, called the Isle of Avalon. It is virtually an island, for it is completely surrounded by marshlands. In Welsh it is called Ynys Afallach, which means the Island of Apples and this fruit once grew in great abundance. After the Battle of Camlann, a noblewoman called Morgan, later the ruler and patroness of these parts as well as being a close blood-relation of King Arthur, carried him off to the island, now known as Glastonbury, so that his wounds could be cared for. Years ago the district had also been called Ynys Gutrin in Welsh, that is the Island of Glass, and from these words the invading Saxons later coined the place-name Glastingebury.

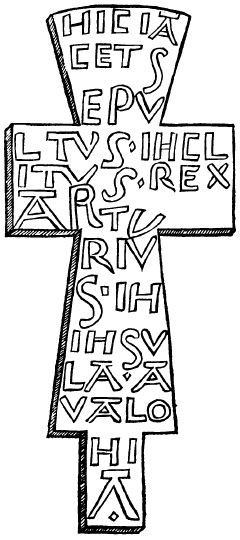
Lead cross inscribed with Arthur's epitaph, published in William Camden's Britannia (1607)

Around 1190, monks at Glastonbury Abbey claimed to have discovered the bones of Arthur and his wife Guinevere. The discovery of the burial is described by chroniclers, notably Gerald, as being just after King Henry II's reign when the new abbot of Glastonbury, Henry de Sully, commissioned a search of the abbey grounds. At a depth of 5 m (16 feet), the monks were said to have discovered an unmarked tomb with a massive treetrunk coffin and, also buried, a lead cross bearing the inscription:

HIC IACET SEPVLTVS INCLITVS REX ARTVRIVS IN INSVLA AVALONIA
hic iacet sepultus inclitus rēx Arturius in īnsula Avalonia.
"Here lies entombed the renowned king Arthur in the island of Avalon."

Accounts of the exact inscription vary, with five different versions existing. One popular today, made famous by Malory, claims "Here lies Arthur, the king that was and the king that shall be" (Hic iacet Arthurus, rex quondam rexque futurus), also known in the now-popular variant "the once and future king" (rex quondam et futurus). The earliest is by Gerald in Liber de Principis instructione c. 1193, who wrote that he viewed the cross in person and traced the lettering. His transcript reads: "Here lies buried the famous Arthurus with Wenneveria his second wife in the isle of Avalon" (Hic jacet sepultus inclitus rex Arthurus cum Wenneveria uxore sua secunda in insula Avallonia). He wrote that in the coffin were two bodies, whom Giraldus refers to as Arthur and "his queen"; the male body's bones were described as gigantic. The account of the burial by the chronicle of Margam Abbey says three bodies were found, the other being that of Mordred; Richard Barber argues that Mordred's name was airbrushed out of the story once his reputation as a traitor was appreciated.

The story is today seen as an example of pseudoarchaeology. Historians generally dismiss the find's authenticity, attributing it to a publicity stunt performed to raise funds to rebuild the Abbey after it had been destroyed by a 1184 fire. (Note: Modern scholarship views the Glastonbury cross as the result of a late 12th-century fraud. See Rahtz 1993; Carey 1999; Harris 2018. It is known for certain the monks later added forged passages discussing Arthurian connections to the comprehensive history of Glastonbury De antiquitae Glatoniensis ecclesie (On Antiquity of Glastonbury Church), written around 1130.) Leslie Alcock in his Arthur's Britain postulated a theory according to which the grave site had been originally discovered in an ancient mausoleum sometime after 945 by Dunstan, the Abbot of Glastonbury, who reburied it along with the 10th-century stone cross; it would then become forgotten again until its rediscovery in 1190.

In 1278, the remains were reburied with great ceremony, attended by King Edward I and Queen Eleanor of Castile, before the High Altar at Glastonbury Abbey. They were moved again in 1368 when the choir was extended. The site became the focus of pilgrimages until the dissolution of the abbey in 1539. The fact that the search for the body is connected to Henry II and Edward I, both kings who fought major Anglo-Welsh wars, has had scholars suggest that propaganda may have played a part as well. Gerald was a constant supporter of royal authority; in his account of the discovery aims to quash the idea of the possibility of King Arthur's messianic return: (Note: Long before this William of Malmesbury, a 12th-century historian interested in Arthur, wrote in his history of England: "But Arthur's grave is nowhere seen, whence antiquity of fables still claims that he will return.")

Many tales are told and many legends have been invented about King Arthur and his mysterious ending. In their stupidity the British [i.e. Welsh, Cornish and Breton] people maintain that he is still alive. Now that the truth is known, I have taken the trouble to add a few more details in this present chapter. The fairy-tales have been snuffed out, and the true and indubitable facts are made known, so that what really happened must be made crystal clear to all and separated from the myths which have accumulated on the subject.

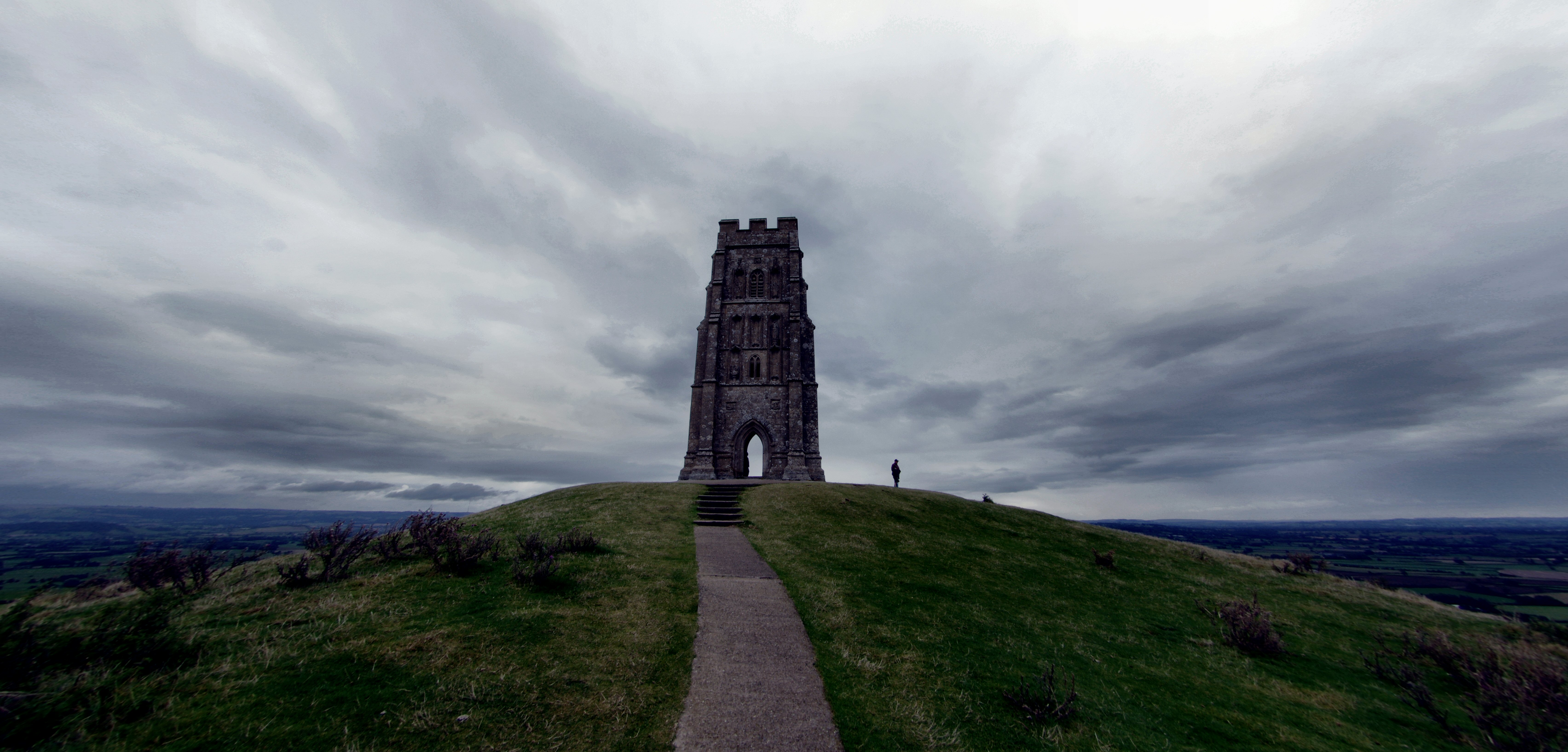
Glastonbury Tor in 2014

The burial discovery ensured that in later romances, histories based on them and in the popular imagination, Glastonbury became increasingly identified with Avalon, an identification that continues strongly today. The later development of the legends of the Holy Grail and Joseph of Arimathea interconnected these legends with Glastonbury and with Avalon, an identification which also seems to be made in Perlesvaus. The popularity of Arthurian romances has meant this area of the Somerset Levels has today become popularly described as the Vale of Avalon.

Modern writers such as Dion Fortune, John Michell, Nicholas Mann and Geoffrey Ashe have formed theories based on perceived links between Glastonbury and Celtic legends of the Otherworld in attempts to link the location firmly with Avalon, drawing on the various legends based on Glastonbury Tor as well as drawing on ideas like Earth mysteries, ley lines and even the myth of Atlantis. Arthurian literature also continues to use Glastonbury as an important location as in The Mists of Avalon, A Glastonbury Romance, and The Bones of Avalon. Even the fact that Somerset has many apple orchards has been drawn in to support the connection. Glastonbury's reputation as the real Avalon has made it a popular site of tourism. Having become one of the major New Age communities in Europe, the area has great religious significance for neo-Pagans and modern Druids, as well as some Christians. Identification of Glastonbury with Avalon within hippie subculture, as seen in the work of Michell and in the Gandalf's Garden community, also helped inspire the annual Glastonbury Festival.

=== Sicily and other locations ===
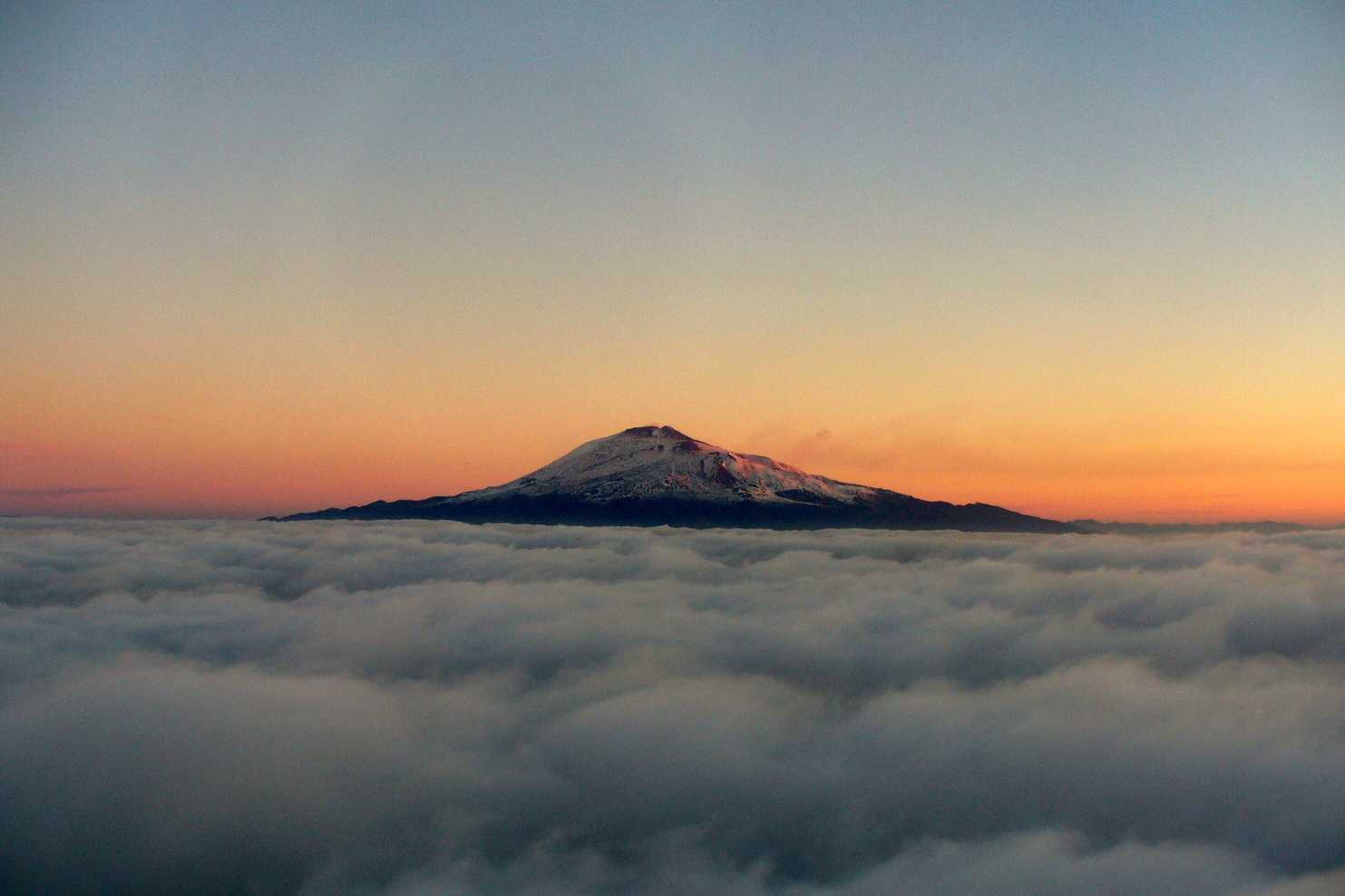
Etna peak above clouds in 2008

Medieval settings for the location of Avalon ranged far beyond Glastonbury. Besides the mentioned examples of Gwynedd and Brasil, they included paradisal underworld realms equated with the other side of the Earth at the antipodes. Italian romances and folklore explicitly link Morgan's and sometimes Arthur's eternal domain with Mount Etna (Mongibel) in Sicily, and the Strait of Messina, located to the north of Etna and associated with the optical mirage phenomenon of Fata Morgana ("Morgan the Fairy"). Pomponius Mela's ancient Roman description of the island of Île de Sein, off the coast of Brittany, was also notably one of Geoffrey of Monmouth's original inspirations for his Avalon.

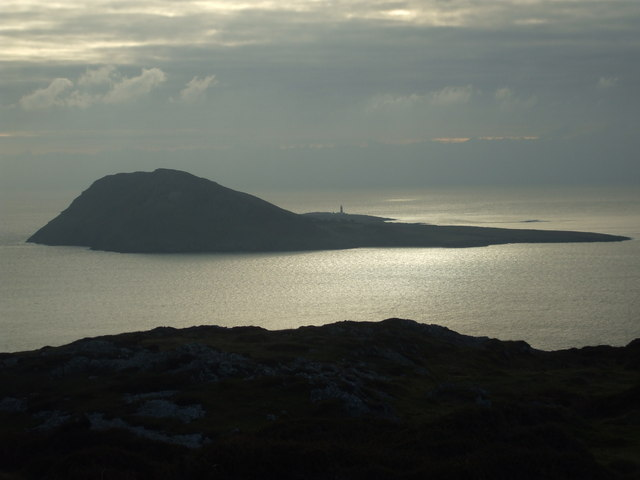
Bardsey Island (Ynys Enlli) seen from Aberdaron (Braich y Pwll) in 2009

In modern times, similar to the search for Arthur's mythical capital Camelot, a variety of sites across Britain, France and elsewhere have been put forward as being the "real Avalon". Such proposed locations include Greenland or other places in or across the Atlantic, the former Roman fort of Aballava (known as Avalana by the sixth century) in Cumbria, Bardsey Island off the coast of Gwynedd, the isle of Île Aval on the coast of Brittany, and Lady's Island in Ireland's Leinster. In the works of William F. Warren, Avalon was compared to Hyperborea along with the Garden of Eden and theorized to be located in the Arctic. Geoffrey Ashe championed an association of Avalon with the town of Avallon in Burgundy, as part of a theory connecting King Arthur to the Romano-British leader Riothamus who was last seen in that area. (Note: According to Ashe, "In Welsh it is Ynys Avallach. Geoffrey's Latin equivalent is Insula Avallonis. It has been influenced by the spelling of a real place called Avallon. Avallon is a Gaulish name with the same meaning, and the real Avalon is in Burgundy—where Arthur's Gallic career ends. Again, we glimpse an earlier and different passing of Arthur, on the Continent and not in Britain. Riothamus too led an army of Britons into Gaul, and was the only British King who did. He too advanced to the neighbourhood of Burgundy. He too was betrayed by a deputy ruler who treated with barbarian enemies. He, too, is last located in Gaul among the pro-Roman Burgundians. He, too, disappears after a fatal battle, without any recorded death. The line of his retreat, prolonged on a map, shows that he was going in the direction of the real Avalon.") Robert Graves identified Avalon with the Spanish island of Majorca (Mallorca), while Laurence Gardner suggested the Isle of Arran off the coast of Scotland. Graham Phillips located the purported grave of his "historical Arthur" candidate Owain Ddantgwyn in the "true site of Avalon" on a former island at Baschurch in Shropshire.

== See also ==
- Brittia
- Tír na nÓg
