= Caer Sidi =

Mythical Welsh otherworld fortress

- Welsh mythology location

In-universe information
- Type: Otherworld
- Characters: Gwydion, Manawydan and Pryderi

Caer Sidi (or Caer Siddi) is the name of a legendary otherworld fortress mentioned in Middle Welsh mythological poems in the Book of Taliesin (14th century).

The poem of Taliesin Preiddeu Annwfn contains the fullest description of the Briton “other world” that mythological literature can provide. It has been collated by Charles Squire (1905) from four different translations of the text, those being of Mr. W. F. Skene, Mr. T. Stephens, Prof. John Rhys, and D. W. Nash. Mr. T. Stephens, in his "Literature of the Kymri", calls it "one of the least intelligible of the mythological poems".

"I will praise the Sovereign, supreme Lord of the land,
Who hath extended his dominion over the shore of the world.
Stout was the prison of Gweir [ Gwydion ] in Caer Sidi,
Through the spite of Pwyll and Pryderi:
No one before him went into it.
The heavy blue chain firmly held the youth,
And before the spoils of Annwn woefully he sang,
And thenceforth till doom he shall remain a bard.
Thrice enough to fill Prydwen [the name of Arthur's ship] we went into it;
Except seven, none returned from Caer Sidi [Revolving Castle].

"Am I not a candidate for fame, to be heard in song
In Caer Pedryvan [Four-cornered Castle], four times revolving?
The first word from the cauldron, when was it spoken?
By the breath of nine maidens it was gently warmed.
Is it not the cauldron of the Chief of Annwn? What is its fashion?
A rim of pearls is round its edge.
It will not cook the food of a coward or one foresworn.
A sword flashing bright will be raised to him,
And left in the hand of Lleminawg.
And before the door of the gate of Uffren [The Cold Place] the lamp was burning.
When went with Arthur--a splendid labour!--
Except seven, non returned from Caer Vedwyd [Castle of Revelry].

"Am I not a candidate for fame, to be heard in song
In Caer Pedryvan, in the Isle of the Strong Door,
Where twilight and pitchy darkness meet together,
And bright wine is the drink of the host?
Thrice enough to fill Prydwen we went on the sea.
Except seven, none returned from Caer Rigor [Kingly Castle].

"I will not allow much praise to the leaders of literature.
Beyond Caer Wydyr [Glass Castle] they saw not the prowess of Arthur;
Three-score hundreds stood on the walls;
It was hard to converse with their watchman.
Thrice enough to fill Prydwen we went with Arthur;
Except seven, none returned from Caer Golud [Castle of Riches].

"I will not allow much praise to the spiritless.
They know not on what day, or who caused it,
Or in what hour of the serene day Cwy was born,
Or who caused that he should not go to the dales of Devwy.
They know not the brindled ox with the broad head-band,
Whose yoke is seven-score handbreadths.
When we went with Arthur, of mournful memory,
Except seven, none returned from Caer Vandwy [another name for otherworld].

"I will not allow much praise to those of drooping courage.
They know not what day the chief arose,
Nor in what hour of the serene day the owner was born,
Nor what animal they keep, with its head of silver.
When we went with Arthur, of anxious striving,
Except seven, non returned from Caer Ochren [another name for otherworld]."

Squire also provides an interpretation of the poem:

"The strong-doored, foursquare fortress of glass, manned by its dumb, ghostly sentinels, spun round in never-ceasing revolution, so that few could find its entrance; it was pitch-dark save for the twilight made by the lamp burning before its circling gate; feasting went on there, and revelry, and in its centre, choicest of its many riches, was the pearl-rimmed cauldron of poetry and inspiration, kept bubbling by the breaths of nine British pythonesses, so that it might give forth its oracles."

Another few lines penned by Taliesin are sometimes connected to Caer Sidi, although they add little knowledge to what has already been stated in the verses above. These lines are contained in a poem called "A Song Concerning the Sons of Llyr ab Brochwel Powys" (Book of Taliesin, poem XIV):

"Perfect is my chair in Caer Sidi:
Plague and age hurt not him who's in it--
They know, Manawyddan and Pryderi.
Three organs round a fire sing before it,
And about its points are ocean's streams
And the abundant well above it--
Sweeter than white wine the drink in it."

This confirms that the "heavy blue chain [that] firmly held the youth" was the sea surrounding Annwn, the Welsh Otherworld, and it makes the point that its inhabitants were freed from age and death. It reveals that the "drink of the host", the white wine, was kept in a well. Three singing organs are mentioned, an addition to the revelry of Caer Vedwyd [Castle of Revelry]. The first line is also thought to suggest that Taliesin himself was a privileged resident of this country.

Some clues are given in the poems as to where the island may be situated. Lundy Island, off the coast of Devonshire, was anciently called Ynys Wair, the "Island of Gweir", or Gwydion. The Welsh translation of the "Seint Grael", an Anglo-Norman romance embodying much of the old British and Gaelic mythology, locates its "Turning Castle" (Caer Sidi), in the district around and comprising Puffin Island, off the coast of Anglesey.

Some attempts have been made to give the fortress a physical location, e.g. as the island of Grassholm off the coast of Pembrokeshire, but Caer Sidi is more likely to belong to the class of otherworldly forts and islands so prevalent in Celtic mythology.
