= Petitcrieu =

Dog from Arthurian legend

- Tristan character
- First appearance: Tristan; c. 12th century
- Created by: Gottfried von Strassburg

In-universe information
- Species: Dog
- Family: Duke Gilan; Tristan; Iseult
- Origin: Avalon

Petitcrieu, alternatively spelled Petitcreiu, Petitcru, or Pticru, is a legendary magical dog from Arthurian legend present in the chivalric romance of Tristan and Iseult.

== In Arthurian legend ==
In Gottfried von Strassburg's Tristan, Petitcrieu was a magical fairy dog from Avalon owned by Duke Gilan of Wales, given to him by a goddess as a token of love. When Tristan visited Gilan after having been exiled from Cornwall, the Duke sent Petitcrieu to cheer up his guest. Petitcrieu was indescribably beautiful and multicolored, and wore a magical golden bell on its collar. The bell had a sweet-sounding ring that made anybody who heard it feel happy. The dog could not move or resist, and had to be carried from place to place and accept whatever treatment it received. In addition, it had no appetite and was incapable of eating.

Tristan made a deal with the Duke that if he killed the giant Urgan, he would receive any reward of his choosing. Upon completing his task, Tristan took Petitcrieu and gave it to Iseult so that she would be happy forever, but she removed the magic bell and threw it into the sea so that she would feel her genuine emotions without having them masked by magic. Without the bell, Petitcrieu could no longer erase Iseult's sorrow, but was able to be her companion in both sorrow and joy.

== Literary analysis ==
In a 1992 article in the journal Colloquia Germanica, Aaron E. Wright argues the Petitcrieu is not actually a dog in Tristan, but rather an inanimate object, as evidenced by the character's unnatural coloration, lack of energy or appetite, and how other characters treat it. In addition, Petitcrieu is referred to by the neuter German pronoun ez (es), equivalent to the English pronoun it, rather than the masculine terms typically used for dogs in German. Wright argues that Petitcrieu may be a fanciful taxidermy dog or an automaton, but is most likely a metaphorical representation of a piece of literature or poetry.

In a 2015 article in Mediaevistik, Christopher R. Clarkson similarly writes that Petitcrieu is a metaphorical representation of art as a distraction. More specifically, he argues that Petitcrieu serves as an aesthetic distraction from the sorrow that the lovers in the romance feel. By rejecting Petitcrieu's magic, Iseult is able to authentically love Tristan, even in his absence.
