= Mendam Berahi =

Legendary ship of Malacca Sultanate

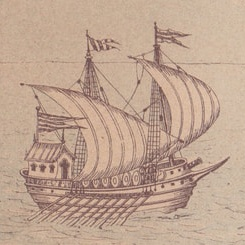
- A Malay galley of the 16th century. This is not Mendam Berahi, but it gives a depiction of what a Malay ghali of that time period looked like.

History

Malacca Sultanate
- Name: Mendam Berahi
- Namesake: Drunk in romance, hidden desire, secret desire, suppressed passion, hidden passion

General characteristics
- Class & type: Ghali or galley
- Length: 180 ft (54.9 m)
- Beam: 36 ft (11.0 m)
- Armament: 7 cannons

Mendam Berahi was a legendary royal galley (Classical Malay: ghali kenaikan raja) said to have been used by the Malacca Sultanate in the early 16th century. This ship is fictional, recorded in the epic Hikayat Hang Tuah, and that type of ship, the ghali, did not exist until after the 1530s.

== Etymology ==
The name Mendam Berahi was not originally Malay, rather it comes from Javanese and Sundanese words mendem birahi. It may also come from Kawi (Old Javanese) and Javanese words mendam brahi, which means drunk in romance.

== Historiography and authenticity ==
Mendam Berahi was only mentioned in the Hikayat Hang Tuah, and no other Malay manuscripts mentioned its existence. Contemporary Portuguese records indicate that galleys appeared in the regional fleets during the late 1530s, before that the mainstay of the Malay fleet was the lancaran. It was not until the 1560s that the ghali became more widespread, mostly used by Acehnese people, not Malays. The word "ghali" itself is a loanword from the Portuguese language, so the existence of ghali during the heyday of the Malacca sultanate is an anachronism. The inhabitants of the Malay peninsula did not use big ships. In naval warfare, the Malays used lancaran and banting, propelled by breast oars (paddles) and 2 masts, with 2 rudders (one on both sides of the hull). The Malays are not accustomed to navigating the ocean, they only make coasting voyages along the shores of the Malay peninsula. According to Afonso de Albuquerque, during the 1511 Portuguese attack on the Malacca Sultanate, the Malays used an unspecified number of lancaran (lanchara) and twenty penjajap (pangajaoa).

The Malaccan people did not encounter the Portuguese in an open, ship-to-ship battle in the sea during their 1509 encounter like was claimed in the Hikayat Hang Tuah, but took the Portuguese unprepared by using disguise, treachery, and ambush to capture the Portuguese delegation.

Records of the ship are only found in the Hikayat Hang Tuah, and other Malay accounts such as the Malay Annals did not record it. Portuguese accounts did not record Mendam Berahi either, although Tomé Pires' Suma Oriental contain references to a large ship, where he mentions a "flagship" of Malacca which carried many bombards. This ship, however, is not necessarily Mendam Berahi and could be another ship. (Note: According to Hikayat Hang Tuah, the Sultanate of Malacca had another ship named Kota Segara (meaning "fortress of the sea"), which was built after Mendam Berahi returned from Majapahit and was used to bring the Malaccan royal entourage to marry the princess of Majapahit. This ship was specially designed to be able to carry several cannons. See Schap 2010a, pp. 126–127 and Salleh 2013, pp. 264–265.) Hikayat Hang Tuah notes that the story of Hang Tuah is in the same timeline as Raden Inu from the Janggala Kingdom (1045–1136) and tells that the Sultan of Malacca wanted to marry Raden Galuh Cendera Kirana. This story was adapted from the Javanese Panji tales, and the Hikayat Hang Tuah story can be concluded as a mere myth.

Because the Mendam Berahi was a fairly large ship, it has often been used as evidence for the Malays' proficiency in shipbuilding by modern Malaysian scholars and politicians, to the point that many people think that the ship really exists. However, a check of the available evidence shows that this assumption is wrong: This ship is a fictional ship, and the great ships of the Nusantara Archipelago were not built by the Malays or by the Sultanate of Malacca. Malacca only produces small vessels, not large vessels. Large shipbuilding industry does not exist in Malacca — their industry is not capable producing deep-sea ships; only small, light, fast-sailing vessels. The people of Malacca purchased big ships (jong) from other parts of Southeast Asia, namely from Java and Pegu, they did not built them.

The Hikayat Hang Tuah was written after the 17th century, more than 100 years after the fall of Malacca. Although Hikayat Hang Tuah's story is set in the Malacca sultanate (1400–1511), it reflects events that occurred in the Johor sultanate in the 17th century, more specifically in Johor's golden age in the 1640s to 1670s. The main character, Hang Tuah, is a fictional character, but the story is partly based on the true story of Admiral Abd al-Jamil (Tun Abdul Jamil) from Johor. Malaccan envoy's voyage to the country of Rum (Ottoman Turks) to buy cannons never happened, the story was based on the sending of a series of Acehnese embassies to the Ottoman Empire in the 16th century.

== Description ==
Mendam Berahi was 60 gaz (180 ft or 54.9 m) long (Note: 1 Malay gaz equals 33–35 inches or 3 feet. See "gaz". Kamus Dewan (4 ed.). Dewan Bahasa dan Pustaka Malaysia. 2017. p. 383.) with a width of 6 depa (36 ft or 11 m). According to the study of Rohaidah Kamaruddin, the conversion of the units mentioned in the old Malay manuscripts will result in a length of 50.292 m and a width of 10.9728 m. According to Irawan Djoko Nugroho, the length is 50 m and the width is 12 m, while Pierre-Yves Manguin estimated it as 67 m long and 11 m wide, with the usual length-to-width ratio found on galleys of about 7:1. The ship was armed with 7 meriam (native cannon). (Note: A meriam originally refers to a class or type of cannon firing 6-pound shots or more, but in modern times refers to cannon in general. See Gardner, G. B. (1936). Keris and Other Malay Weapons. Singapore: Progressive Publishing Company. p. 93.)

The ship was made with a strong frame, and the walls were constructed with beautiful wainscotting, and covered by velvet cloth colored in yellow, red, and green. The roof (possibly referring to the roof of the rear cabin) was made of yellow and red glass, with several patterns depicting clouds and lightning. The ship was also decorated with a royal yellow cloth and was outfitted with a throne.

Mendam Berahi was under the control of Admiral Hang Tuah when he traveled to fourteen countries or cities. The ship was also used to establish relations with other countries, conduct trade, and transportation, which included bringing pilgrims to Mecca. A trip to Mecca lasted months and required a constant supply of food. However, Mendam Berahi could not transport food, water, and other necessities in large quantities, so the ship had to stop at ports to get supplies and shelter from poor weather.

This ship was specially built to carry a message to the king of Majapahit about the desire of the king of Malacca to marry the daughter of the king of Majapahit. However, the proposal story was actually a fabrication made by the author of the epic because Gajah Mada, who was mentioned in the story, had already died at that time.

== Story according to Hikayat Hang Tuah ==
In the Hikayat Hang Tuah, it is said that the ship was made for the purpose of the king of Malacca, (Note: The name of the king of Malacca who requested the construction of this ship was not recorded. Some people believe he was Mansur Shah (reigned 1459−1477), but the chronology in the Hikayat Hang Tuah is unclear: the Portuguese and their language were already known at this time (even though the Portuguese only arrived in 1509), in addition, it is said that Hang Tuah lived at the same time as Gajah Mada (died 1364). Nevertheless, the presence of the Portuguese indicates that this ship supposedly existed between 1509 and 1511. See Adam 2016, p. 149−150) to propose to the princess of Majapahit, named Raden Galuh Cendera Kirana (or Raden Mas Ayu in other version), who was described as having a face as beautiful as a shining full moon and a body as pure as gold. Construction of this ship took 30–40 days. To speed up the work, the Bendahara (Vizier) of Malacca divided it into several groups: Hang Tuah worked on the bow, the shipbuilders were appointed to work on the ship's midsection, and the Bendahara worked on the ship's stern. The ornate pattern was designed by Hang Tuah, and for the space between the mainmast and mizzenmast designed by the Bendahara, from the bow to the mainmast was also designed by Hang Tuah, while Hang Jebat, Hang Lekir, Hang Lekiu, and all the royal singers and slaves do the carving. Hang Tuah was the one who proposed the name "Mendam Berahi" (Malay for Secret Desire) to be given to the ship.

After construction was completed, Mendam Berahi sailed to Majapahit to bring letters and gifts to the Betara (king) of Majapahit to convey the wishes of the king of Malacca. Mendam Berahi departure began with firing bedil as a salute. When they arrived in Majapahit, the fleet of Malaccan envoys signaled their arrival by firing bedil, which frightened the fishermen. Patih Karma Wijaya and Hang Tuah informed that there were seven Malaccan ships coming, and their intention is to propose to the daughter of the king of Majapahit. Several trials and tests were given to the Malay group to test their quality, and in the end Hang Tuah was given the title of admiral (Malay: Laksamana, Javanese: Penggawa Agung) by the Betara of Majapahit. After the business in Majapahit was over, Mendam Berahi sailed to Tuban for 7 days, and to Jayakarta for 3 days and 3 nights. Patih Karma Wijaya stayed in Jayakarta for 7 days waiting for the other ships. After all the ships were assembled they set sail and arrived in Palembang in a few days. Patih Karma Wijaya and Hang Tuah stopped waiting for the other ships. After all the ships have arrived, they set sail for Malacca.

Before the king of Malacca went to Java to marry the princess of Majapahit, he ordered the construction of one more ship. This ship was designed in the shape of the Kumbang Nuri because it was intended for the future queen of Malacca and her ladies-in-waiting and because the design could carry several cannons. The ship was named Kota Segara Kuning (or simply Kota Segara) by the king. The Malaccan royal entourage sailed to Majapahit, the king with Hang Tuah, Hang Jebat, Hang Kasturi, Hang Lekir, and Hang Lekiu boarded Kota Segara, while Patih Kerma Wijaya, Tun Bija Sura, and all the messengers and royal sign-bearers boarded Mendam Berahi. After the wedding was over, Mendam Berahi returned to Malacca with the Tuban-Jayakarta-Palembang route. Arriving in Palembang, the king of Malacca received news that Sang Jaya Nantaka (Note: Sang Jaya Nantaka was the younger brother of the king of Malacca who was exiled from the kingdom by his brother because it was rumored that he would overthrow the king. Sang Jaya Nantaka was eventually escorted by a merchant to the land of Keling (India) and was appointed king there. Sang Jaya Nantaka still sent news to his brother in Malacca after becoming king. See Schap 2010a, pp. 76–99 and Salleh 2013, pp. 175–216.) had sent 30 perahu from Keling (Note: Kalinga, the area around the Coromandel Coast in India, in the hikayat is Bijaya Nagaram, the land of Keling, Madras Province, India.) to convey his news to Malacca, but 20 of them were destroyed by the Portuguese.

After some time, Mendam Berahi was used by Admiral Hang Tuah to go to Inderapura to confirm whether Megat Terenggano, who was in Inderapura, was planning to attack Malacca. Mendam Berahi was also used by Hang Tuah, Hang Jebat, and Hang Kesturi to face Majapahit after two Majapahit envoys named Rangga and Barit Ketika came to question the king of Malacca about why he did not send an envoy to Majapahit. Hang Tuah replied that the reason Malacca did not send envoys to Majapahit was that Malacca would be attacked by Megat Terenggano and the king of Inderapura. After the affair in Majapahit was over, Hang Tuah used Mendam Berahi to go to the land of Keling to ask about the younger brother of the king of Malacca (Sang Jaya Nantaka) along with Tun Kesturi who knows the Keling language and has been awarded the name Maharaja Setia. Mendam Berahi was also used to attack the country of Inderapura.

In 1509, when the Portuguese first arrived in Malacca, admiral Hang Tuah was sick. Mendam Berahi was under the command of Maharaja Setia, and the ship managed to ram and sink 2 Portuguese jalilah (a type of ship). Seeing that they were outnumbered, the Malaccan fleet retreated to Malacca and asked Hang Tuah to come along. Hang Tuah finally agreed to join the battle. The two fleets met and attacked each other. In the end, Hang Tuah was shot and fell into the water, before finally being helped by the soldiers to climb into Mendam Berahi. The Malaccan fleet fled to Malacca with the Portuguese fleet in pursuit, but seeing their leader also injured and asking to be brought back to Portugal, the Portuguese fleet eventually withdrew.

With the threat of the Portuguese, the king of Malacca ordered Admiral Hang Tuah and Maharaja Setia to go to the country of Rum (the Ottoman Empire) to buy bedil (guns) and large meriam (cannons). Hang Tuah went on Mendam Berahi accompanied by many boats. After 5 days and 5 nights, he arrived in Aceh, staying there for about 12 days. After getting enough supplies, Hang Tuah sailed to Deva Island (Maldives), arriving there after about 10 days. After sailing for 2 months, Mendam Berahi arrived in Jeddah. Hang Tuah, Maharaja Setia, and their entourage anchored for a while, intending to go to the tomb of Eve. They reached it by walking for 2 days and 2 nights to Mecca and performed the rites of Hajj. They also went to Medina to visit the graves of Muhammad and his companions. After returning from the pilgrimage, the group sailed for 20 days to Egypt and stayed there for about 3 months to buy guns and load them onto the boats. Hikayat Hang Tuah also tells how the Malaccan boats and ships sailed for 17 days and arrived in Istanbul, but in reality, this route could not be passed because the Suez Canal did not exist at that time. Whatever the case, in Rum they managed to buy about 800 large and small guns, plus the 120 previously purchased in Egypt. The group arrived back in Malacca after about 4 months of sailing.

== Replica project ==
A replica of Mendam Berahi will be built in Klebang by a team of historians, and cost 10 million Malaysian ringgit. This project is expected to take 2 years to complete.

The University of Putra Malaysia Institute of Mathematical Research led this research and shipbuilding project based on a study of old manuscripts obtained from around the world that described the appearance of the ship. The information collected is then converted into modern language and the size is estimated. The project is estimated to be ready in 2023.

There is also a Malaysian scholar who disagrees with the making of the Mendam Berahi ship replica. Prof. Dr. Ahmad Jelani Halimi conducted research and concluded that the galley-type ship (ghali) was never used by the Malacca Sultanate in its golden age. The galley-type ship was introduced by the Portuguese to the archipelago after the fall of Malacca in 1511, and records of Mendam Berahi are only found in 1 literary work from a non-contemporary source (Hikayat Hang Tuah), without a supporting or comparing source.

== See also ==
- Argo, a ship from the Greek mythology
- Prydwen, the legendary ship of King Arthur
- Takarabune, a mythical ship of Japanese folklore
