= Hafgan =

Welsh mythological figure

Hafgan is one of the kings of Annwn, the otherworld in Welsh mythology. He appears in the First Branch of the Mabinogi as the main rival of Arawn, the other king of Annwn. The dominions of the two kings sit side by side, and Hafgan is constantly warring against Arawn. In the story Pwyll, Prince of Dyfed, Pwyll, in order to gain Arawn's friendship, agrees to switch places with him for one year and one day and to battle against Hafgan in order to rid Arawn of his difficulty. Before they exchange places, Arawn gives specific instructions to Pwyll to kill him with one stroke and no more. In the past when Arawn had battled and had struck Hafgan nearly to his death, Hafgan had begged him to give another stroke, and when Arawn had done so, Hafgan recovered from his injuries and was in good health for battle again the next day."

In one year Pwyll, wearing the guise of Arawn, goes to battle and succeeds in injuring Hafgan nearly to death, breaking through his shield and armor and knocking him to the ground. Just as Arawn had warned, Hafgan pleaded that Pwyll finish the slaughter and kill him thoroughly. Pwyll refuses to do so, saying, “I may yet repent this, but, whoever else may slay you now, I will not do so." Hafgan then tells his lords he has met his death and will no longer lead them. When Hafgan's men see their leader is at his end, they realize there is no other king but Arawn, and consent to be the subjects of the new and only king of Annwn.
