= Arawn =

King of the otherworld realm of Annwn in Welsh mythology

In Welsh mythology, Arawn (Welsh pronunciation: [ˈarau̯n]) was the king of the otherworld realm of Annwn who appears prominently in the first branch of the Mabinogi, and alluded to in the fourth. In later tradition, the role of the king of Annwn was largely attributed to the Welsh psychopomp, Gwyn ap Nudd—meaning "white" (i.e. 'winter'), a possible kenning for his true name. However, Arawn's memory is retained in a traditional saying found in an old Cardigan folktale:

Hir yw'r dydd a hir yw'r nos, a hir yw aros Arawn "Long is the day and long is the night, and long is the waiting of Arawn"

Arawn's association with the hunt, horns, and the Otherworld has prompted some scholars to associate Arawn with the continental Gaulish god Cernunnos.

== Role in Welsh tradition ==
=== The Four Branches ===
In the First Branch of the Mabinogi, Pwyll mistakenly stumbles into the realm of Annwn and finds white hounds with red ears feeding on a stag. Pwyll chases the hounds off, only to learn that the hounds belonged to Arawn, ruler of Annwn. To pay for the misdeed, Arawn asks Pwyll to trade places with him for a year and a day and defeat Hafgan, Arawn's rival, at the end of this time, something Arawn has attempted but has been unable to do. Arawn, meanwhile, takes Pwyll's place as lord of Dyfed. Arawn and Pwyll become good friends because when Pwyll wore Arawn's shape, he did not sleep with Arawn's wife.

A friendship between the two realms is retained long after Pwyll's death; in the fourth branch, Pryderi, Pwyll's son and lord of Dyfed has received a gift of otherworldly pigs from Arawn. These pigs are eventually stolen by a Venedotian magician and trickster, Gwydion fab Don. Gwydion poses as a bard, and asks to be rewarded for his poems and music with the pigs Pryderi owned. According to Pryderi, he is still in a pact with Arawn and cannot give the pigs to anyone. Gwydion then tricks Pryderi into trading him the pigs (as that is allowed in the deal with Arawn), which eventually leads to Pryderi's invasion of Gwynedd. In the ensuing war, Gwydion kills Pryderi in single combat.

While Arawn is noticeably missing from the Second through Fourth branches of the Mabinogi, some scholars claim this is due to the missing portions of the original text and that Arawn and the events of the First Branch of the Mabinogi directly lead to the birth of Pwyll's son Pryderi. The reasoning behind the birth of Pryderi having been a result of Pwyll and Arawn's meeting being missing from the original text is because while a quarter of the Mabinogi is spent talking about the mystical Otherworld of Annwn, but it is not mentioned in the other branches of the Mabinogi. Other scholars disagree with this idea, as many of these newer translations create more problems within the story and do not ground themselves in the Llyfr Gwyn, from which the Mabinogi was translated.

==== Influence within the Mabinogion ====
While Arawn is integral to the First Branch of the Mabinogi, his character seems to be more of a reinforcer of the lore behind Pwyll (and potentially Pryderi) than a character that directly impacts the story of the later Mabinogi Branches. The mysticism that is involved within the entirety of the Mabinogi is first shown when Arawn and Pwyll switch bodies for a year.

=== Other legends ===
In Welsh folklore, the Cŵn Annwn or "Hounds of Annwn" ride through the skies in autumn, winter, and early spring. The baying of the hounds was identified with the crying of wild geese as they migrate and the quarry of the hounds as wandering spirits, being chased to Annwn. However, Arawn himself is not referred to in these traditions. Later the myth was Christianised to describe the "capturing of human souls and the chasing of damned souls to Annwn", and Annwn was equated with the "Hell" of Christian tradition.

Some writers, notably Robert Graves, have written of an incident in which Amaethon steals a dog, lapwing and a white roebuck from Arawn, leading to the Cad Goddeu (Battle of the Trees), which Arawn lost to Amaethon and his brother, Gwydion. The standard text of 'Cad Goddeu' in the Book of Taliesin makes no mention of this, but the Welsh Triads records the Battle of Goddeu as one of the "Three Futile Battles of the Island of Britain...it was brought about by the cause of the bitch, together with the roebuck and the plover", while Lady Charlotte Guest notes in her Mabinogion an account in the Myvyrian Archaeology that the battle "was on account of a white roebuck and a whelp; and they came from Hell, and Amathaon ab Don brought them. And therefore Amathaon ab Don, and Arawn, King of Annwn (Hell), fought. And there was a man in that battle, unless his name were known he could not be overcome; and there was on the other side a woman called Achren, and unless her name were known her party could not be overcome. And Gwydion ab Don guessed the name of the man".

=== Influences on other literary works ===
In the Arthurian story Sir Gawain and the Green Knight, the interplay of Gawain, his host Bertilak (who is actually The Green Knight), and Bertilak's wife are very similar to the events of Pwyll and Arawn's encounter. In this case, Arawn seems to have been used as a basis for Bertilak/The Green Knight, while Gawain was very similar to Pwyll. The parallel between the Green Knight and Arawn extends to the treatment of the "newcomer." In both stories the Knight/Arawn's wife tries to sleep with the newcomer, but both remain loyal to the Knight/Arawn. In both stories as a result of their faithfulness, the newcomer is rewarded with the favor of the Knight/Arawn.

The character of Arawn Death-Lord in the series The Chronicles of Prydain by Lloyd Alexander is based on King Arawn from the Mabinogi. However, many of the characters traits are altered within these books, as Arawn is depicted as an evil ruler. The stories still retain the idea that he is king of the Otherworld, and that he is in a struggle to take over the land from another king. In this story Arawn is defeated by his foes instead of taking over his kingdom like in the Mabinogi.

In Brut y Brenhennidd, a Welsh translation of Geoffrey of Monmouth's Historia regum Britanniae, Arawn vab Kynvarch is listed as the King of "Ysgotlont" (Scotland), up the role filled by Anguselus in Geoffrey's version, being first made king by Uther Pendragon and then showing up when Arthur holds his court at Caerleon, and otherwise acting as an ally of Arthur's, sending troops on his campaigns against the Romans.

=== Name ===
A cleric of the Old Welsh name Araun witnessed two charters of 860 preserved in the Book of Llandaf.

== See also ==
- 15810 Arawn, minor planet
