= Annwn =

Otherworld in Welsh mythology

- Welsh mythology location

In-universe information
- Type: Otherworld
- Characters: Arawn, Gwyn ap Nudd, Hafgan

Annwn ([ˈanʊn]), or Annwfn ([ˈanʊvn]), is the Otherworld in Welsh mythology. Ruled by Arawn (or, in Arthurian literature, by Gwyn ap Nudd), it is a world of delights and eternal youth where disease is absent and food is ever-abundant.

== Name and etymology ==
Middle Welsh sources suggest that the term was recognised as meaning "very deep" in medieval times. Alternatively, Ifor Williams suggested that a closer translation of the word could be the "unworld."

The appearance of a form antumnos on an ancient Gaulish curse tablet, which means an ('other') + tumnos ('world') suggests that the original term may have been *ande-dubnos, a common Gallo-Brittonic word that literally meant 'underworld'. The compound *ande-dubnos is derived from Proto-Celtic ande- ('below') attached to *dubnos ('deep', 'world'). The latter also underlies Old Irish domain ('deep') and domun ('world').

== Whereabouts of Annwn ==
In both Welsh and Irish mythologies, the Otherworld was believed to be located either on an island or underneath the earth. In the First Branch of the Mabinogi, it is implied that Annwn is a land within Dyfed, while the context of the Arthurian poem Preiddeu Annwfn suggests an island location. Two other otherworldly feasts that occur in the Second Branch of the Mabinogi are located in Harlech in northwest Wales and on Ynys Gwales in southwest Pembrokeshire.

== Locations inside Annwn ==
- Caer Sidi ("Revolving/Spinning Fortress"): A fortress containing the Cauldron of Annwn, the "Chair" of Taliesin, and where Gweir was imprisoned.

It was also named:

- Caer Wydyr ("Glass Fortress"): A fortress guarded by six thousand men whose watchman was difficult to converse with.
- Caer Pedryvan ("Four cornered/peaked fortress"): A fortress located on the "Isle of the strong door"
- Caer Vedwyd ("Fortress of Revelry/Drunkenness")
- Caer Vandwy ("Fortress of God's Peak")
- Caer Rigor ("Kingly Fortress"/"Fortress of Hardness")
- Caer Golud ("Fortress of Riches")

== Appearances in Welsh literature ==
Annwn plays a reasonably prominent role in the Four Branches of the Mabinogi, a set of four interlinked mythological tales dating from the early medieval period. In the First Branch of the Mabinogi, entitled Pwyll, Prince of Dyfed, the eponymous prince offends Arawn, ruler of Annwn, by baiting his hunting hounds on a stag that Arawn's dogs had brought down. In recompense he exchanges places with Arawn for a year and defeats Arawn's enemy Hafgan, while Arawn rules in his stead in Dyfed. During this year, Pwyll abstains from sleeping with Arawn's wife, earning himself gratitude and eternal friendship from Arawn. On his return, Pwyll becomes known by the title Penn Annwn, "Head (or Ruler) of Annwn." In the Fourth Branch, Arawn is mentioned but does not appear; it is revealed that he sent a gift of otherworldly pigs to Pwyll's son and successor, Pryderi, which ultimately leads to war between Dyfed and Gwynedd.

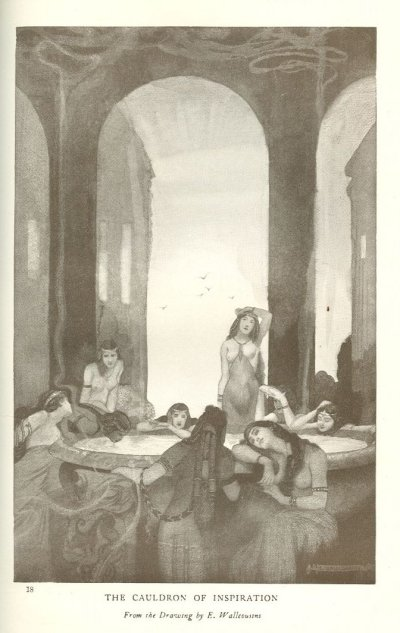
Image by Ernest Wallcousins, 1912. "In Caer Pedryvan, four its revolutions; In the first word from the cauldron when spoken, From the breath of nine maidens it was gently warmed".

The similarly mythological epic poem Cad Goddeu describes a battle between Gwynedd and the forces of Annwn, led again by Arawn. It is revealed that Amaethon, nephew to Math, king of Gwynedd, stole a bitch, a lapwing and a roebuck from the Otherworld, leading to a war between the two peoples. The denizens of Annwn are depicted as bizarre and hellish creatures; these include a "wide-mawed" beast with a hundred heads and bearing a host beneath the root of its tongue and another under its neck, a hundred-clawed black-groined toad, and a "mottled ridged serpent, with a thousand souls, by their sins, tortured in the holds of its flesh". Gwydion, the Venedotian hero and magician, successfully defeats Arawn's army, first by enchanting the trees to rise up and fight and then by guessing the name of the enemy hero Bran, thus winning the battle.

Preiddeu Annwfn, an early medieval poem found in the Book of Taliesin, describes a voyage led by King Arthur to the numerous otherworldy kingdoms within Annwn, either to rescue the prisoner Gweir or to retrieve the cauldron of the Head of Annwn. The narrator of the poem is possibly intended to be Taliesin himself. One line can be interpreted as implying that he received his gift of poetry or speech from a magic cauldron, as Taliesin does in other texts, and Taliesin's name is connected to a similar story in another work. The speaker relates how he journeyed with Arthur and three boatloads of men into Annwfn, but only seven returned. Annwfn is apparently referred to by several names, including "Mound Fortress," "Four-Peaked Fortress," and "Glass Fortress", though it is possible the poet intended these to be distinct places. Within the Mound Fort's walls Gweir, one of the "Three Exalted Prisoners of Britain" known from the Welsh Triads, is imprisoned in chains. The narrator then describes the cauldron of the Chief of Annwn: it is finished with pearl and will not boil a coward's food. Whatever tragedy ultimately killed all but seven of them is not clearly explained. The poem continues with an excoriation of "little men" and monks, who lack various forms of knowledge possessed by the poet.

Over time, the role of king of Annwn was transferred to Gwyn ap Nudd, a hunter and psychopomp, who may have been the Welsh personification of winter. The Christian Vita Collen tells of Saint Collen vanquishing Gwyn and his otherworldly court from Glastonbury Tor with the use of holy water. In Culhwch and Olwen, an early Welsh Arthurian tale, it is said that God gave Gwyn ap Nudd control over the demons lest "this world be destroyed." Tradition revolves around Gwyn leading his spectral hunts, the Cŵn Annwn ("Hounds of Annwn"), on his hunt for mortal souls. Angelika Rüdiger's Doctoral Thesis, 'Y Tylwyth Teg: an analysis of a literary motif' (Bangor University, 2021) is a detailed study of supernatural characters connected with Annwn (including Gwyn ap Nudd), covering a period from the earliest sources to the 19th and 20th centuries.

== Annwn in modern culture ==
J. R. R. Tolkien used the word annún in his Middle-earth mythology as a term in the Elvish language Sindarin (phonologically inspired by Welsh) meaning "west" or "sunset" (cognate with the Quenya Andúnë), often referring figuratively to the "True West", i.e. the blessed land of Aman beyond the Sea, the Lonely Island Tol Eressëa, or (in the later mannish usage) to the drowned island of Númenor. This is an example of Tolkien's method of world-building by "explaining the true meaning" of various real-world words by assigning them an alternative "Elvish" etymology. The Sindarin word for 'king', aran is also similar to Arawn, the king of Annwn.

The Anglo-Welsh author, poet, critic and playwright, David Annwn Jones (born 1953) adopted the name Annwn in 1975 in the same spirit that his great-uncle, the Welsh bard Henry Lloyd (ap Hefin), had adopted the name Ap Hefin ("Son of the Summer Solstice").

Annwn is the name of a German medieval and pagan folk duo from North Rhine-Westphalia. The name was also previously used by an unrelated Celtic Rock trio in Berkeley, California, from 1991 until the death of lead singer Leigh Ann Hussey on 16 May 2006.

Annwn is one of the deep realms of Faerie in October Daye, a 2012 urban fantasy series written by Seanan McGuire.

British author Niel Bushnell's novels Sorrowline and Timesmith feature an island called Annwn in the realm of Otherworld.

Children's author Lloyd Alexander used the name "Annuvin", an Anglicized spelling of the variant Annwfyn, in his Chronicles of Prydain series. Annuvin is the domain of Arawn, who in these novels plays the role of a villainous dark lord.

On the British rock band The Mechanisms' 2014 album High Noon Over Camelot, a space Western retelling of the Arthurian mythos, "Annwn" is the name given to the lower levels of the space station Fort Galfridian.

One of the areas in the platform-adventure video game La-Mulana 2 is named Annwfn.

Annwn: The Otherworld is a surreal stealth/strategy game drawing on Welsh mythic motifs.

== See also ==
- Avalon
- Caer Sidi
- Tír na nÓg

== Sources ==
- Lambert, Pierre-Yves. (2003). La langue gauloise: description linguistique, commentaire d’inscriptions choisies. Paris: Errance. 2nd ed.
- Sims-Williams, Patrick. (1990). "Some Celtic otherworld terms". Celtic Language, Celtic Culture: a Festschrift for Eric P. Hamp, ed. Ann T. E. Matonis and Daniel F. Mela, pp. 57–84. Van Nuys, Ca.: Ford & Bailie.
- Davies, Sioned. (2007). The Mabinogion – a new translation. (Oxford World's Classics.)
- Mac Cana, Proinsias. (1983). Celtic Mythology (Library of the World's Myths and Legends). Littlehampton Book Services Ltd.
- Lindahl, C. A. (2000–2002). Medieval Folklore. Oxford: Oxford University Press, Inc.
- Matthews, John. (1996). Sources of the Grail. Edinburgh: Floris Books ISBN 0-86315-233-3.
- Dixon-Kennedy, Mike. (1996). Celtic Myth & Legend. London: Blandford and Cassel Imprint ISBN 0-7137-2571-0.
