= Celtic Otherworld =

Realm of the deities in Celtic mythology

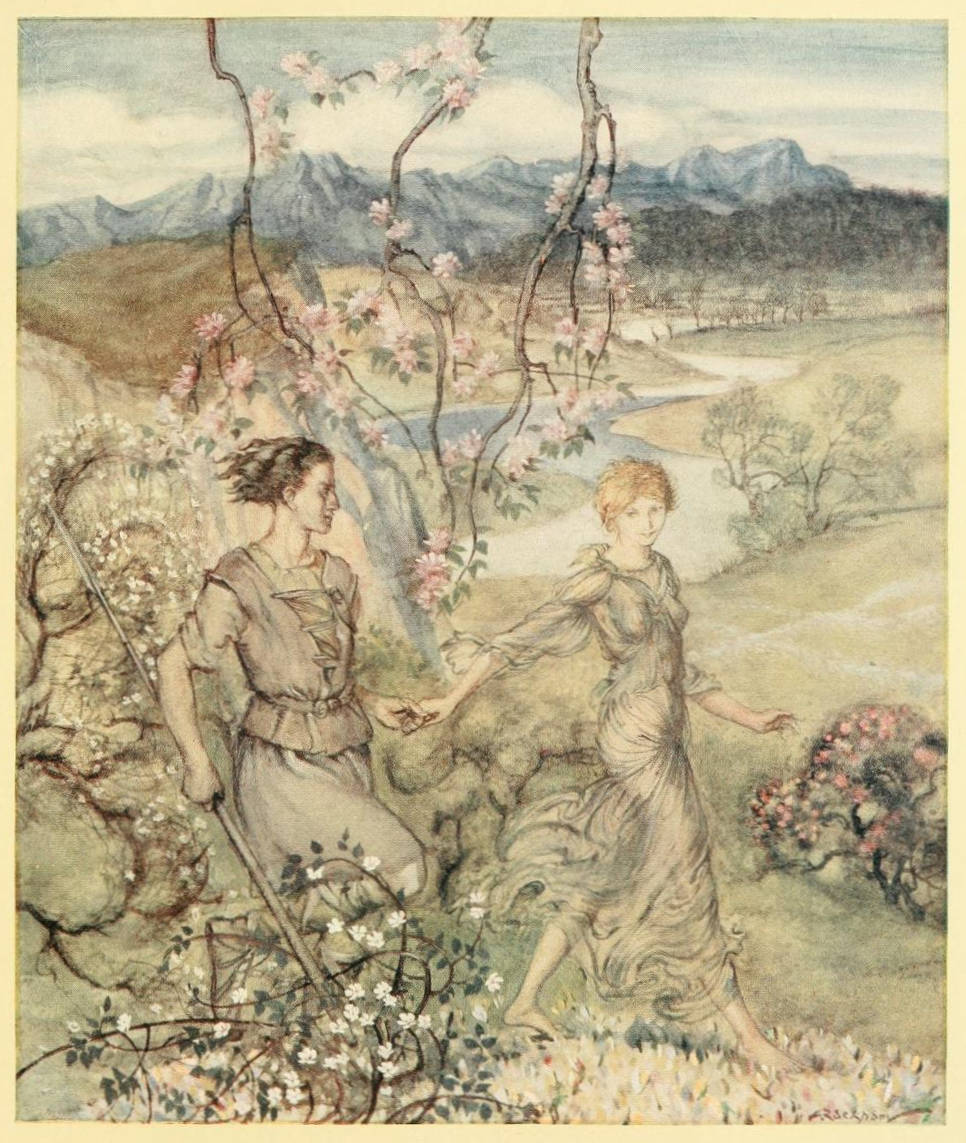
The 'Land of the Ever Young' depicted by Arthur Rackham in Irish Fairy Tales (1920).

In Celtic mythology, the Otherworld is the realm of the deities and possibly also the dead. In Gaelic and Brittonic myth it is usually a supernatural realm of everlasting youth, beauty, health, abundance and joy. It is described either as a parallel world that exists alongside our own, or as a heavenly land beyond the sea or under the earth. The Otherworld is usually elusive, but various mythical heroes visit it either through chance or after being invited by one of its residents. They often reach it by entering ancient burial mounds or caves, or by going under water or across the western sea. Sometimes, they suddenly find themselves in the Otherworld with the appearance of a magic mist, supernatural beings or unusual animals. An otherworldly woman may invite the hero into the Otherworld by offering an apple or a silver apple branch, or a ball of thread to follow as it unwinds.

The Otherworld is usually called Annwn in Welsh mythology and Avalon in Arthurian legend. In Irish mythology it is Tír na nÓg. There is also Mag Mell and Emain Ablach, Tech Duinn, the last of which is where the souls of the dead gather.

== Irish mythology ==
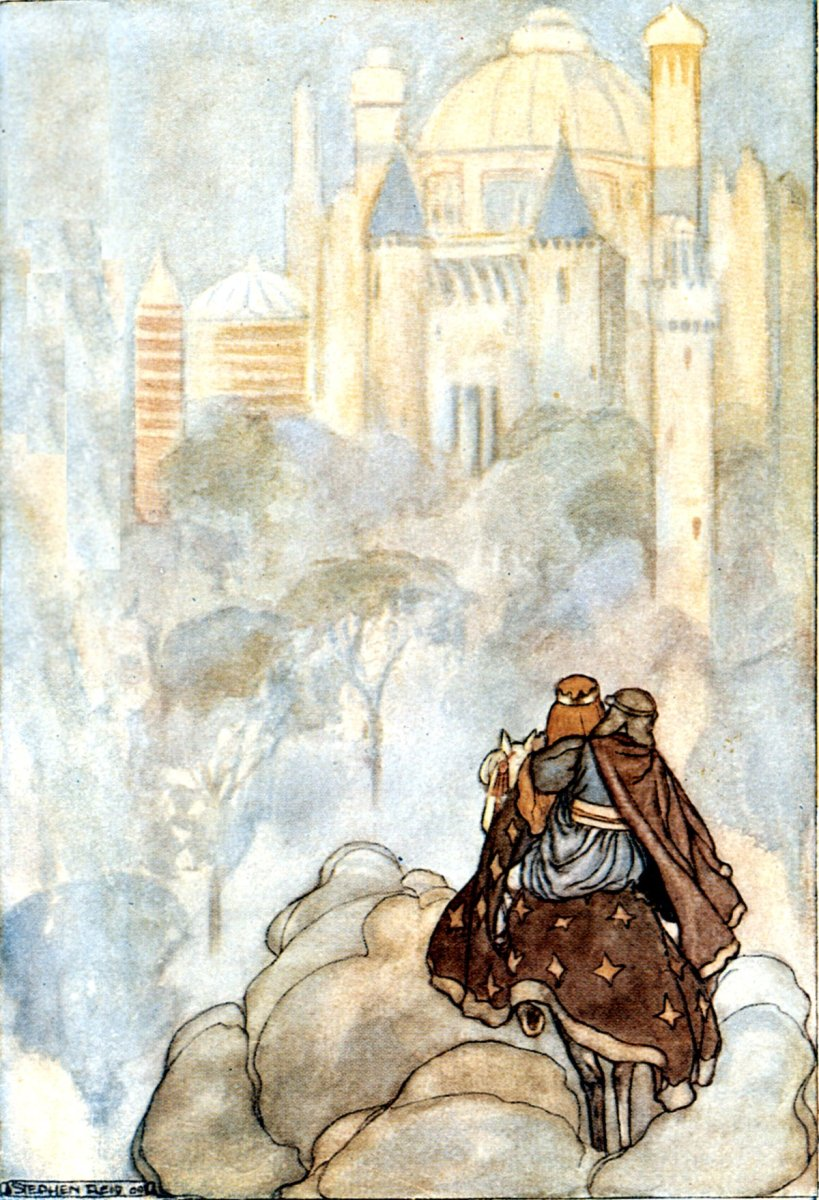
Oisín and Niamh approaching a palace in Tír na nÓg, illustration by Stephen Reid in T. W. Rolleston's The High Deeds of Finn (1910)

In Irish mythology, the Otherworld has various names. Names of the Otherworld, or places within it, include Tír nAill ("the other land"), Tír Tairngire ("land of promise/promised land"), Tír na nÓg ("land of the young/land of youth"), Tír fo Thuinn ("land under the wave"), Tír na mBeo ("land of the living"), Mag Mell ("plain of delight"), Mag Findargat ("the white-silver plain"), Mag Argatnél ("the silver-cloud plain"), Mag Ildathach ("the multicoloured plain"), Mag Ciúin ("the gentle plain"), and Emain Ablach (possibly "isle of apples").

It is described as a supernatural realm where there is everlasting youth, beauty, health, abundance and joy, and where time moves differently. It is the dwelling place of the gods (the Tuatha Dé Danann) as well as certain heroes and ancestors. It was probably similar to the Elysium of Greek mythology and both may have a shared origin in ancient Proto-Indo-European religion. The Otherworld is elusive, but various mythical heroes—such as Cúchulainn, Fionn and Bran—visit it either through chance or after being invited by one of its residents. In Irish myth and later folklore, the festivals of Samhain and Beltane (Bealtaine) are liminal times, when contact with the Otherworld was more likely.

In the tales, the Otherworld is often reached by entering ancient burial mounds, such as those at Brú na Bóinne and Cnoc Meadha. These were known as sídhe ("Otherworld dwellings") and were the dwellings of the gods, later called the aos sí or daoine sí ("Otherworld folk"). Irish mythology says the gods retreated into the sídhe when the Gaels (Milesians) took Ireland from them. In some tales, the Otherworld is reached by going under the waters of pools, lakes, or the sea, or else by crossing the western sea. In Irish Immrama ("voyage") tales, a beautiful young Otherworld woman often approaches the hero and sings to him of this happy land. Sometimes she offers him an apple, or the promise of her love in exchange for his help in battle. He follows her, and they journey over the sea together and are seen no more. Their journey may be in a boat of glass, in a chariot, or on horseback (usually on a white horse, as in the case of the goddess Niamh of the Golden Hair).

Sometimes the hero returns after what he believes is a short time, only to find that all his companions are dead and he has actually been away for hundreds of years. Sometimes the hero sets out on a quest, and a magic mist descends upon him. He may find himself before an unusual palace and enter to find a warrior or a beautiful woman who makes him welcome. The woman may be the goddess Fand, the warrior may be Manannán mac Lir or Lugh, and after strange adventures the hero may return successfully. However, even when the mortal manages to return to his own time and place, he is forever changed by his contact with the Otherworld.

The Otherworld was also seen as a source of authority. In the tale Baile in Scáil ("the phantom's ecstatic vision"), Conn of the Hundred Battles visits an Otherworld hall, where the god Lugh legitimizes his kingship and that of his successors.

In Irish myth there is another otherworldly realm called Tech Duinn ("House of Donn" or "House of the Dark One"). It was believed that the souls of the dead travelled to Tech Duinn; perhaps to remain there forever, or perhaps before reaching their final destination in the Otherworld, or before being reincarnated. Donn is portrayed as a god of the dead and ancestor of the Gaels. Tech Duinn is commonly identified with Bull Rock, an islet off the west coast of Ireland which resembles a portal tomb. In Ireland there was a belief that the souls of the dead departed westwards over the sea with the setting sun, westward also being the direction in which the phantom island anglicised as Hy-Brasil was purported to be found.

== Welsh mythology ==
In Welsh mythology, the Otherworld is usually called Annwn or Annwfn. The Welsh tale of Branwen, daughter of Llyr ends with the survivors of the great battle feasting in the Otherworld, in the presence of the severed head of Bran the Blessed, having forgotten all their suffering and sorrow, and having become unaware of the passage of time. Annwn is ruled by the Otherworld kings Arawn and Gwyn ap Nudd.

In the First Branch of the Welsh tales known as the Mabinogi, entitled Pwyll, Prince of Dyfed, the eponymous prince offends Arawn, ruler of Annwn, by baiting his hunting hounds on a stag that Arawn's dogs had brought down. In recompense, Pwyll swaps places with Arawn for a year and defeats Arawn's enemy Hafgan. Meanwhile, Arawn rules Dyfed. During this year, Pwyll does not sleep with Arawn's wife, earning himself gratitude from Arawn. On his return, Pwyll becomes known by the title Pen Annwn, "Head (or Ruler) of Annwn".

== Continental Celtic mythology ==
The Gauls divided the universe into three parts: Albios ("heaven, white-world, upper-world"), Bitu ("world of the living beings"), and Dubnos ("hell, lower-world, black-world").^{;}^{;} According to Lucan, the Gaulish druids believed that the soul went to an Otherworld, which he calls by the Latin name Orbis alius, before being reincarnated.

Greco-Roman geographers tell us about Celtic belief in islands consecrated to gods and heroes. Among them were Anglesey (Môn), off the north coast of Wales, which was the sacred isle of the druids of Britain; the Scilly isles, where archaeological remains of proto-historical temples have been found; and some of the Hebrides, which were, in the Gaelic tradition, home to ghosts and demons: on one of them, Skye, the Irish hero Cúchulainn was taught by the warrior woman Scathach.

Byzantine scholar Procopius of Caesarea described the Otherworld of the ancient Gauls. He said it was thought that the land of the dead lay west of Great Britain. The Continental Celtic myths told that once the souls of the dead had left their bodies, they traveled to the northwest coast of Gaul and took a boat toward Britain. When they crossed the Channel, the souls went to the homes of the fishermen, and knocked desperately at their doors. The fishermen then went out of their houses and led the souls to their destination in ghostly ships.

There are still remains of those beliefs in the folklore of Brittany, where the name Bag an Noz is used to denote those ships who carry the dead to their goal: Anatole Le Braz describes in his book La légende de la mort chez les Bretons armoricains the existence of souls' processions which make their way toward coastal places like Laoual, to start their last travel from there.

In Asturian mythology, there are many stories which describe human encounters with xanas, fairies which are dancing around a chief fairy, the Xana Mega, or the "Queen of Fairies", known as xacias in Galicia. The castro of Altamira is said to hide an enormous underground realm which is ruled by a royal couple, and whose entrance is found some place on the hill.

== Modern treatments ==
Modern authors such as J. R. R. Tolkien, C. S. Lewis, Jim Butcher, Ursula K. Le Guin and George R. R. Martin have all drawn inspiration from various aspects of the Celtic Otherworld. In Tolkien's The Hobbit, the inspiration is seen when the narrative ventures into the otherworldly elven realm of the Mirkwood. In Lewis's The Chronicles of Narnia, there exists a magical land called Narnia populated by magical beings, talking animals, and other supernatural elements. In Butcher's The Dresden Files, most supernatural beings come from another plane of existence called the "Nevernever," including the Sidhe (inspired by the Aos Sí) and Tuatha Dé Danann. In Martin's A Song of Ice and Fire, magical races such as Children of the Forest, Giants and the Others originated from the Lands of Always Winter, with the Others specifically described as "Sidhe made of ice."

== See also ==
- The Vision of Adamnán
- Caer Sidi
- Land of Maidens
