= Richard Barber =

British historian of the Middle Ages (born 1941)

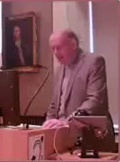
- Born: Richard William Barber; 30 October 1941 (age 84)
- Occupations: Historian, publisher
- Writing career
- Subjects: Middle Ages; Chivalry; Medieval literature Mythology

Richard William Barber FRSL FSA FRHistS (born 30 October 1941) is a British historian who has published several books about medieval history and literature. His book The Knight and Chivalry, about the interplay between history and literature, won the Somerset Maugham Award, a British literary prize, in 1971. A similarly-themed 2004 book, The Holy Grail: Imagination and Belief, was widely praised in the UK press, and received major reviews in The New York Times and The New Republic.

== Life ==
Barber was educated at Marlborough College, and Corpus Christi College, Cambridge. In 1969 he founded The Boydell Press, which later became Boydell & Brewer Ltd, a publisher in medieval studies, and acted as group managing director until 2009. In 1989, Boydell & Brewer Ltd, in association with the University of Rochester, started the University of Rochester Press in upstate New York. In 2016, the directors of Boydell & Brewer Ltd transferred the company into a trust for the benefit of the employees. He was visiting professor in the History department at the University of York from 2013 to 2016, and was awarded an honorary doctorate there in 2015.

Barber has long specialised in Arthurian legend, beginning with the general survey, Arthur of Albion (1961). His other major interest is historical biography: he has published Henry Plantagenet (1964) and a biography of Edward, the Black Prince, Edward Prince of Wales and Aquitaine (1978). Recent biographical books are Edward III and the Triumph of England: The Battle of Crécy and the Order of the Garter (2013), which includes a reappraisal of the origins of the Order, and Henry II in the Penguin Monarchs series (2015). His latest book is Magnificence and Princely Splendour in the Middle Ages (2020).

He was elected a Fellow of the Royal Society of Literature in 1971.

== Select bibliography ==
- Arthur of Albion: an introduction to the Arthurian literature and Legends of England (Barrie & Rockliff with Pall Mall P, 1961).
- The Knight and Chivalry (London; 1970).
- The Figure of Arthur (London: Longman, 1972).
- King Arthur: in Legend and History (Boydell Press, 1973).
- Edward, Prince of Wales and Aquitaine (London; 1978).
- Life and Campaigns of the Black Prince (1979).
- The Arthurian Legends: An Illustrated Anthology (Woodbridge: Boydell Press, 1979).
- King Arthur: Hero and Legend (Woodbridge: Boydell Press, 1986).
- (Edited and introduced) Myths & Legends of the British Isles (Woodbridge: Boydell Press, 1999).
- Legends of Arthur (The Boydell Press; 2001) ISBN 0-85115-837-4
- The Holy Grail: Imagination and Belief (London: Allen Lane & Harvard University Press; 2004). ISBN 978-0-674-01390-2
- The Holy Grail, The History of a Legend (Penguin Books Ltd; 2004).
- The Reign of Chivalry (2nd Ed. UK: The Boydell Press; 2005) ISBN 1-84383-182-1
- Edward III and the Triumph of England: The Battle of Crécy and the Order of the Garter (London: Allen Lane, 2013)
- Henry II: A Prince Among Princes (Penguin Monarchs) (London: Penguin Books, 2015).
- Magnificence and Princely Splendour in the Middle Ages (Woodbridge: Boydell Press, 2020).

=== Collaborations ===
- with Juliet Barker: Tournaments: Jousts, Chivalry and Pageants in the Middle Ages (Woodbridge: Boydell, 1989).
