= Draco Normannicus =

The Draco Normannicus (Norman Dragon) is a chronicle written c. 1167–1169 by Étienne de Rouen (Stephen of Rouen), a Norman Benedictine monk from Bec-Hellouin. Considered Étienne's principal work, it survives in the Vatican Library. The manuscript was initially anonymous, however it has been accepted for over one hundred years that Étienne is the undisputed author. It is a chronicle of the Normans' history, from their arrival in the former kingdom of Neustria and the founding of Normandy up to the events which occurred during Étienne's life. There is an emphasis on the territorial conflicts which occurred between Kings Henry II and Louis VII.

== Content and name ==
The Draco (considered an epic by some critics, such as Irene Harris and Elizabeth Kuhl) was based largely on the work of Robert of Torigni and William of Jumièges' Gesta Normannorum Ducum. The poem itself is unfinished, and also adapts parts of the Roman de Brut by Wace. The poem runs to nearly 4,400 lines, though it has lost at least two passages, estimated at around one hundred verses each.

The conventional modern form of the title, Draco Normannicus, was chosen by Richard Howlett in his edition published in 1885. In the manuscript it occurs only in a different word order, as Normannicus Draco. Howlett also translated the title as "the Norman Standard", rather than literally as "Norman Dragon", as the Draco is named for the dragon-shaped banners which the Normans followed into battle.

=== Historical characters mentioned ===
Matilda of England, daughter to King Henry I of England, later to become the Empress Matilda after her marriage to the Holy Roman Emperor Henry V, becomes a central point during the narrative, as well as Étienne's vision of the dynasty and historical identity of the Norman people. The work gives a detailed account on the funeral rites of Matilda, carried out by the archbishop of Rouen, Rotrou.

In the poem, Étienne names Morgan Le Fay definitively as the sister of the legendary King Arthur, and ruler of the isle of Avalon. He also makes mention that Morgan is immortal, (Note: nympha perennis (eternal nymph)) and has the ability to grant immortality to Arthur with the aid of the herbs found on the isle. In previous epics Morgan had not been named as sister to Arthur. Only in Chrétien de Troyes' poem Erec and Enide was Morgan transformed from sorceress to sister, and this innovation was followed by Étienne in the Draco.

== Analysis ==
According to Martin Aurell, Étienne is the only author of the Arthurian legends known to have had a direct relationship with Henry II. Aurell believes that Étienne, growing up at a time when the Normans were committed to gaining independence from France, was completely devoted to the cause of Henry II, and that this ideology is clearly visible in the Draco. Aurell states the poem has "the character of a piece of propaganda totally committed to the cause of Henry II" and that it includes a "violent diatribe against Thomas Becket", which Étienne wrote shortly before Becket was murdered in Canterbury Cathedral in 1170. There are extensive passages devoted to the funeral rites of Matilda, who lived out her last twenty years at the priory of Notre Dame du Pré, on the outskirts of Rouen.

Elizabeth Kuhl believes that as there is only one extant copy of the work remaining, it shows that the poem received little interest at the time it was written. However she states that assumptions on the meanings of how writing on historical matters should be presented led to the Draco being evaluated negatively, but in more recent times it is now accepted that "all historical writing arranges and makes sense out of its past and present in ways that are not inherent to events themselves". Initially, the Draco received no attention from scholars since, under the assumptions of how history ought to be written, it was deemed a failure, but when viewed from the latter perspective it is, according to Kuhl, an excellent example. Kuhl also states that another copy, which has since been lost, was known to have been made.

== Bibliography ==
- Aurell, Martin (2007). "Henry II and Arthurian Legend". In Harper-Bill, Christopher; Vincent, Nicholas (eds.). Henry II: New Interpretations. Boydell Press. pp. 362–394. ISBN 978-1843833406.
- Bates, David (2013). The Normans and Empire. Oxford University Press. ISBN 978-0199674411.
- Chibnall, Marjorie (2004). "Matilda [Matilda of England] (1102-1167), empress, consort of Heinrich V". Oxford Dictionary of National Biography (online ed.). Oxford University Press. doi:10.1093/ref:odnb/18338. (Subscription, Wikipedia Library access or UK public library membership required.)
- Echard, Siân (1998). Arthurian Narrative in the Latin Tradition. Cambridge University Press. ISBN 978-0521621267.
- Farina, William (2010). Chretien De Troyes and the Dawn of Arthurian Romance. McFarland & Co. ISBN 978-0786448661.
- Harris, Irene (1994). "Stephen of Rouen' s Draco Normannicus: A Norman Epic". In Davidson, Lola Sharon; Mukherjee, Soumyendra Nath; Zlatar, Zdenko (eds.). The Epic in History. Sydney Studies in Society and Culture. Vol. 11. pp. 112–24. ISBN 9780949405098.
- Hebert, Jill M. (2013). Morgan Le Fay, Shapeshifter. Palgrave Macmillan. ISBN 978-1137022646.
- Kuhl, Elizabeth (2014). "Time and identity in Stephen of Rouen's Draco Normannicus". Journal of Medieval History. 40 (4): 421–438. doi:10.1080/03044181.2014.942691. S2CID 159677572.
- Leake Day, Mildred (2005). "Introduction". In Leake Day, Mildred (ed.). Latin Arthurian Literature. D.S.Brewer. ISBN 978-1843840640.
- Tatlock, J. S. P. (1993). "Geoffrey and King Arthur in "Normannicus Draco": (Continued)". Modern Philology. 31 (1). University of Chicago Press: 1–18. doi:10.1086/388068. JSTOR 434360. S2CID 162326171.
