= Étienne de Rouen =

Étienne de Rouen (died c. 1169), also Stephen of Rouen and Latin: Stephanus de Rouen, was a Norman Benedictine monk of Bec Abbey of the twelfth century, and a chronicler and poet.

The dukes of Normandy commissioned and inspired epic literature to record and legitimise their rule, and Wace, Orderic Vitalis and Stephen were among those who wrote in their service. Stephen is known for his Latin verse chronicle Draco Normannicus ("Standard of the Normans"), a chronicle running from the eleventh century to 1169; it draws on Dudo of St. Quentin and William of Jumièges.: Poetically it is supposed that he was influenced by the Ilias of Simon Chèvre d'Or.

Stephen's work includes an elegy addressed to Waleran, Earl of Worcester, and he also made an abridgement of Quintilian.
