= King Arthur =

Legendary king of the Britons

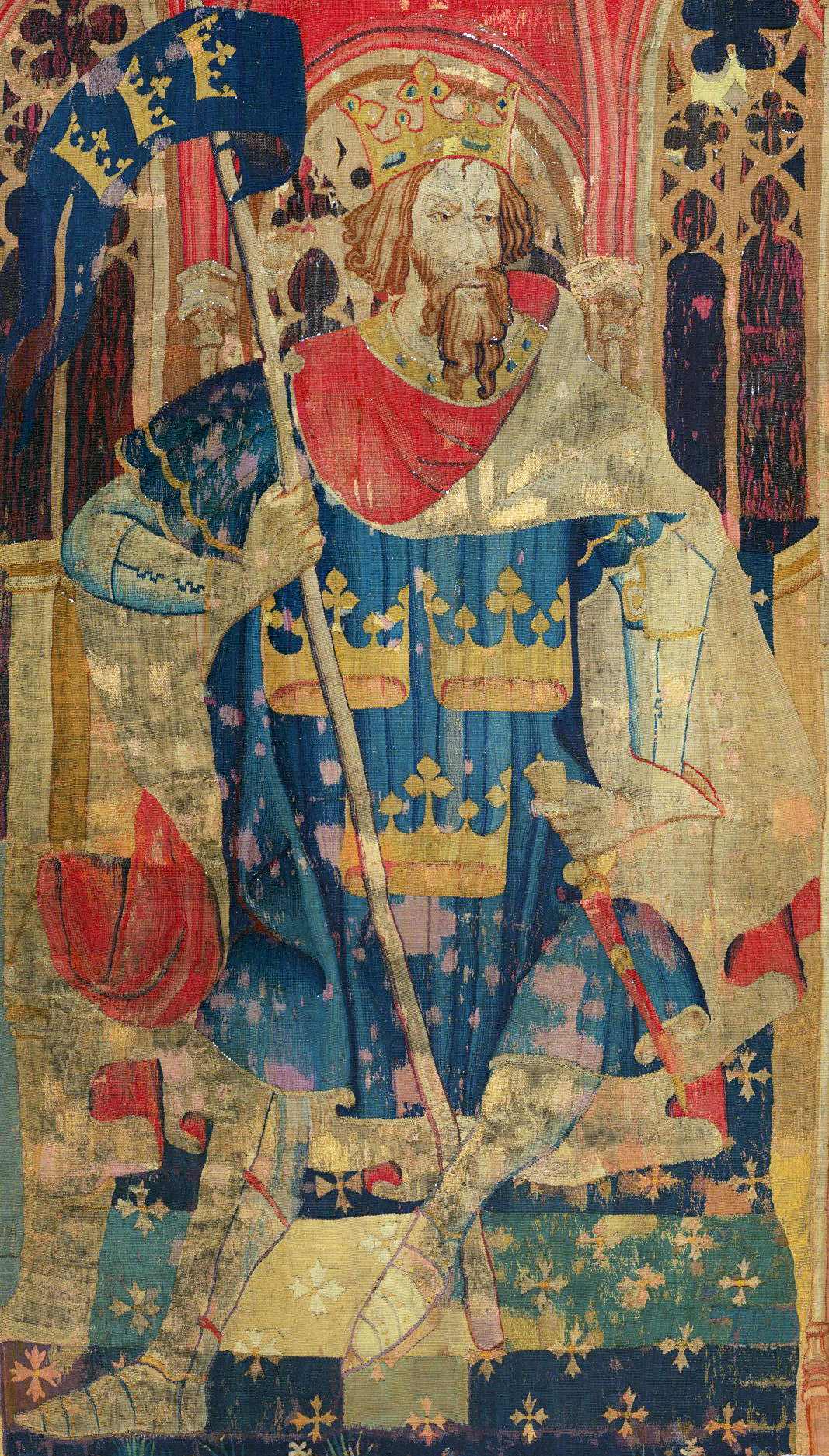
Tapestry showing Arthur as one of the Nine Worthies, c.1400.

King Arthur (Welsh: Brenin Arthur; Cornish: Arthur Gernow; Breton: Roue Arzhur; French: Roi Arthur) was a legendary king of Britain. He is a folk hero and a central figure in the medieval literary tradition known as the Matter of Britain.

In Welsh sources, Arthur is portrayed as a leader of the post-Roman Britons in battles against the Anglo-Saxons in the late 5th and early 6th centuries. He first appears in two early medieval historical sources, the Annales Cambriae and the Historia Brittonum, but these date to 300 years after he is supposed to have lived, and most historians who study the period do not consider him a historical figure. His name also occurs in early Welsh poetic sources, such as Y Gododdin, but it may be a late interpolation. Arthur's character developed through Welsh mythology, appearing either as a great warrior defending Britain from human and supernatural enemies or as a magical figure of folklore, and was sometimes associated with the Welsh otherworld Annwn.

The legendary Arthur developed as a figure of international interest largely through the popularity of Geoffrey of Monmouth's fanciful and imaginative 12th-century Historia Regum Britanniae (History of the Kings of Britain). Geoffrey depicted Arthur as a king of Britain who defeated the Saxons and established a vast empire. Many elements and incidents that are now an integral part of the Arthurian story appear in Geoffrey's Historia, including Arthur's father Uther Pendragon, the magician Merlin, Arthur's wife Guinevere, the sword Excalibur, Arthur's conception at Tintagel, his final battle against Mordred at Camlann, and his final rest in Avalon. Chrétien de Troyes, the 12th-century French writer who added Lancelot and the Holy Grail to the story, began the genre of Arthurian romance, which in turn became a significant strand of medieval literature. In these French stories, the narrative focus often shifts from King Arthur himself to other characters, such as various Knights of the Round Table.

The themes, events and characters of the Arthurian legend vary widely from text to text, and there is no one canonical version. Arthurian literature thrived during the Middle Ages but waned in the following centuries until it experienced a major resurgence in the 19th century. In the 21st century the legend continues to have prominence, not only in literature but also in adaptations for theatre, film, television, comics and other media.

== Historicity ==
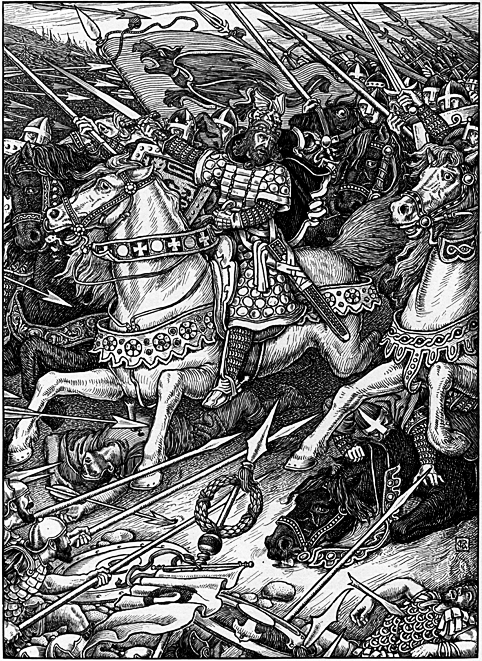
"Arthur Leading the Charge at Mount Badon" 1898

King Arthur was traditionally accepted as a historic person. He was originally thought to have been an ancient British war commander and, at least from the early 12th century, a king. There was, however, much discussion regarding his various deeds, and contemporary scholars and clerics generally refuted the popular medieval belief in his extreme longevity and future return. From the eighteenth century onwards, there has been academic debate about the historicity of Arthur. Details of Arthur's story are mainly composed of Welsh mythology, English folklore and literary invention, and most modern historians writing about the period do not think that he was a historical figure.

One school of thought, citing entries in the Historia Brittonum (History of the Britons) and Annales Cambriae (Welsh Annals), saw Arthur as a genuine historical Romano-British leader who fought against the invading Anglo-Saxons sometime in the late-5th to early-6th century.

The Historia Brittonum, a 9th-century Latin historical compilation attributed in some late manuscripts to a Welsh cleric called Nennius, contains the first datable mention of King Arthur, listing twelve battles that Arthur fought. These culminate in the Battle of Badon, where he is said to have single-handedly killed 960 men. Recent studies question the reliability of the Historia Brittonum.

Archaeological evidence in the Low Countries and what was to become England shows that early Anglo-Saxon migration to Great Britain reversed between 500 and 550, concurring with Frankish chronicles. John Davies notes this as consistent with the British victory at Badon Hill, attributed to Arthur by Nennius.

The other text that seems to support the case for Arthur's historical existence is the 10th-century Annales Cambriae, which also links Arthur with the Battle of Badon. The Annales date this battle to 516–518 and also mention the Battle of Camlann, in which Arthur and Medraut (Mordred) were both killed, dated to 537–539. These details have often been used to bolster confidence in the Historia's account and confirm that Arthur fought at Badon.

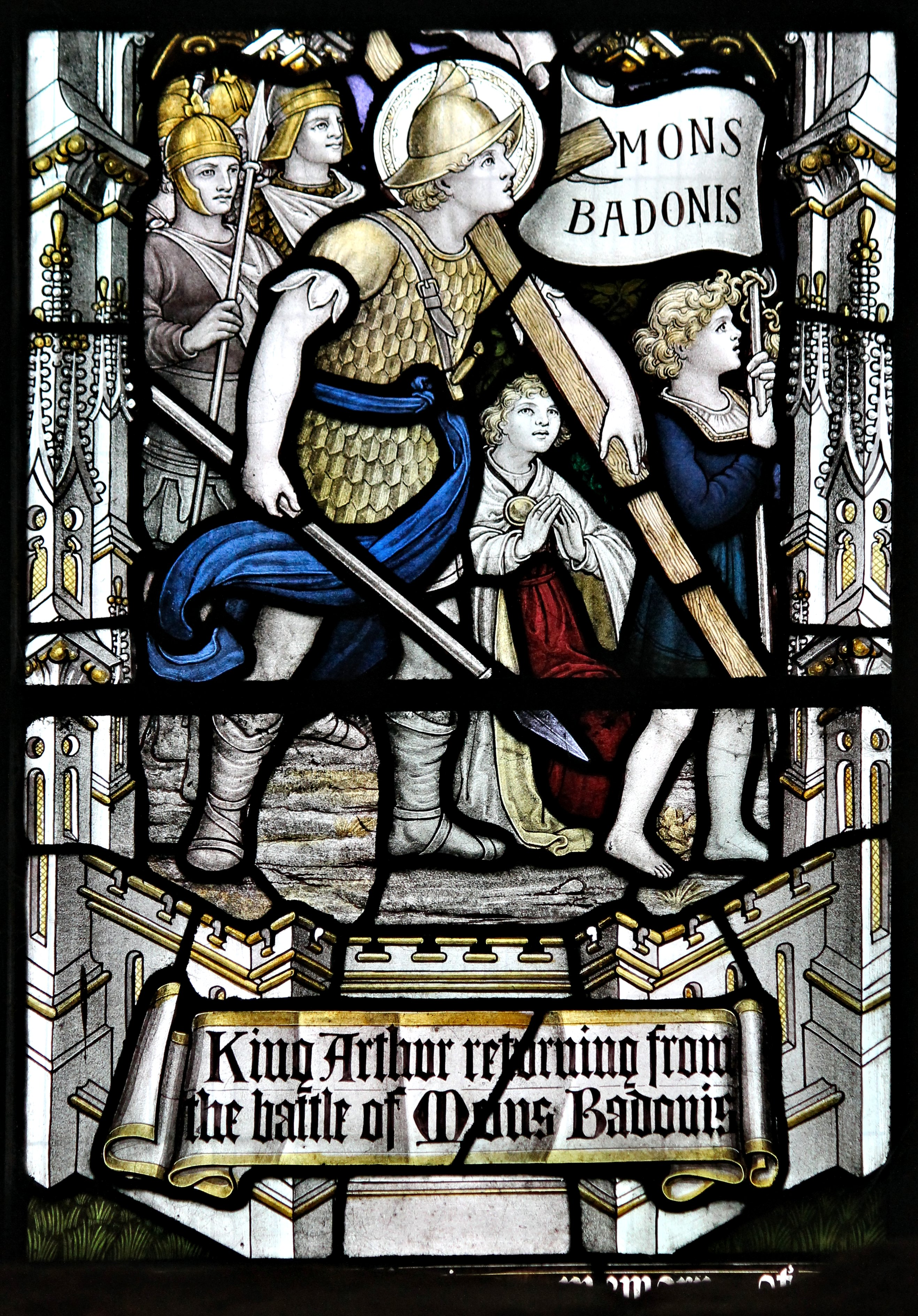
King Arthur returning from the Battle of Mons Badonis (or Mount Badon). First reference to Arthur, found in early Welsh literature. Stained glass in Llandaff Cathedral, Cardiff.

Problems have been identified, however, with using this source to support the Historia Brittonum's account. The latest research shows that the Annales Cambriae was based on a chronicle begun in the late 8th century in Wales. Additionally, the complex textual history of the Annales Cambriae precludes any certainty that the Arthurian annals were added to it even that early. They were more likely added at some point in the 10th century and may never have existed in any earlier set of annals. The Badon entry probably derived from the Historia Brittonum.

This lack of convincing early evidence is the reason many recent historians exclude Arthur from their accounts of sub-Roman Britain. In the view of the historian Thomas Charles-Edwards, "At this stage of the enquiry, one can only say that there may well have been an historical Arthur [but ...] the historian can as yet say nothing of value about him". These modern admissions of ignorance are a relatively recent trend; earlier generations of historians were less sceptical. The historian John Morris made the putative reign of Arthur the organising principle of his history of sub-Roman Britain and Ireland, The Age of Arthur (1973). Even so, he found little to say about a historical Arthur.

Partly in reaction to such theories, another school of thought emerged, arguing that Arthur had no historical existence. Morris's Age of Arthur prompted the archaeologist Nowell Myres to observe that "no figure on the borderline of history and mythology has wasted more of the historian's time". Gildas's 6th-century polemic De Excidio et Conquestu Britanniae (On the Ruin and Conquest of Britain), written within living memory of Badon, mentions the battle but does not mention Arthur. He is also absent from Bede's early-8th-century Ecclesiastical History of the English People, which bases its account of Badon on De Excidio. Arthur is not mentioned in the Anglo-Saxon Chronicle or named in any surviving manuscript written between 400 and 820. The historian David Dumville wrote: "I think we can dispose of him [Arthur] quite briefly. He owes his place in our history books to a 'no smoke without fire' school of thought ... The fact of the matter is that there is no historical evidence about Arthur; we must reject him from our histories and, above all, from the titles of our books."

Some scholars argue that Arthur was originally a fictional hero of folklore—or even a half-forgotten Celtic deity—who became credited with real deeds in the distant past. They cite parallels with figures such as the Kentish Hengist and Horsa, who may be totemic horse-gods that later became historicised. Bede ascribed to these legendary figures a historical role in the 5th-century Anglo-Saxon conquest of eastern Britain. It is not even certain that Arthur was considered a king in the early texts. Neither the Historia nor the Annales calls him "rex.

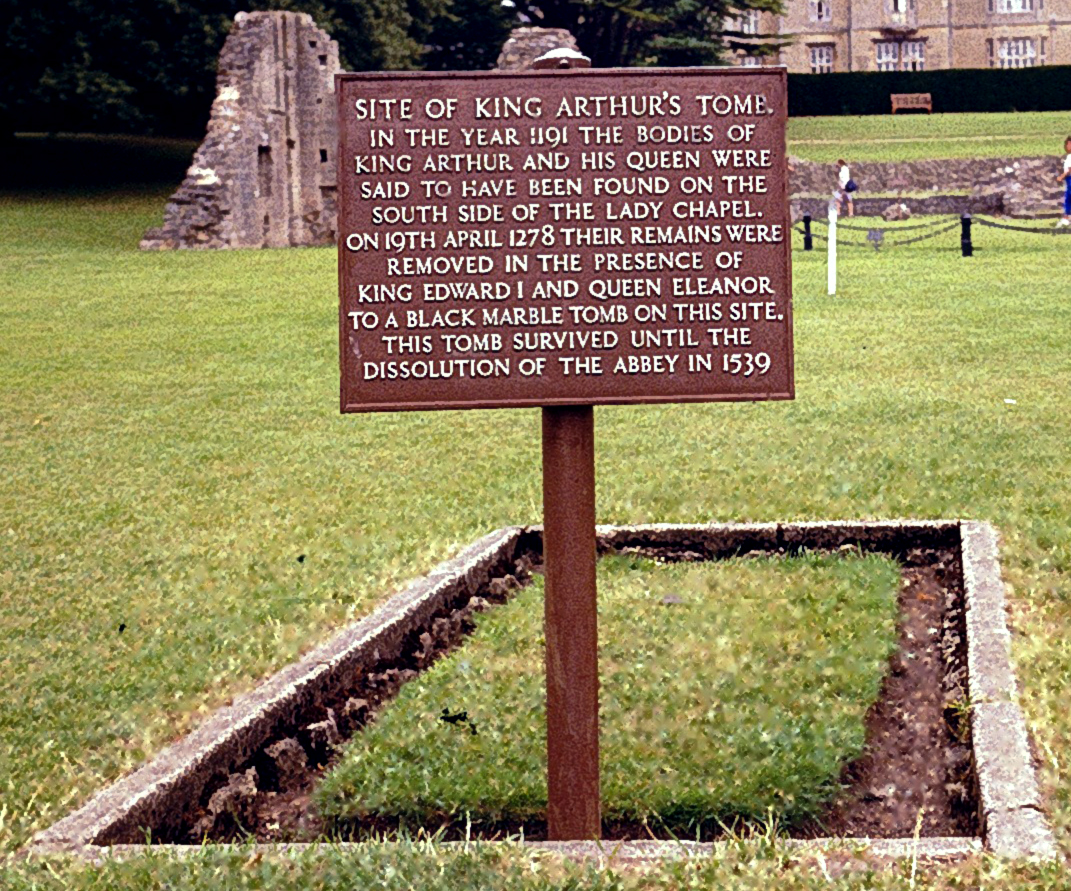
Supposed former gravesite of Arthur at Glastonbury Abbey in Somerset

Andrew Breeze argues that Arthur was a historical character who fought other Britons in the area of the future border between England and Scotland and claims to have identified the locations of his battles as well as the place and date of his death (in the context of the extreme weather events of 535–536), but his conclusions are disputed. Other scholars have questioned his findings, which they consider are based on coincidental resemblances between place-names. Nicholas Higham comments that it is difficult to justify identifying Arthur as the leader in northern battles listed in the Historia Brittonum while rejecting the implication in the same work that they were fought against Anglo-Saxons and that there is no textual justification for separating Badon from the other battles.

Several historical figures have been proposed as the basis for Arthur, ranging from Lucius Artorius Castus, a Roman officer who served in Britain in the 2nd or 3rd century, to sub-Roman British rulers such as Riotamus, Ambrosius Aurelianus, and the Welsh king Owain Ddantgwyn. However, no convincing evidence for these identifications has emerged.

== Name ==
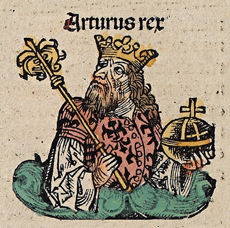
"Arturus rex" (King Arthur), a 1493 illustration from an early printed book, the Nuremberg Chronicle

The origin of the Welsh name "Arthur" remains a matter of debate. The most widely accepted etymology derives it from the Roman nomen gentile (family name) Artorius. Artorius itself is of obscure and contested etymology. Linguist Stephan Zimmer suggests Artorius possibly had a Celtic origin, being a Latinization of a hypothetical name *Artorījos, in turn derived from an older patronym *Arto-rīg-ios, meaning "son of the bear/warrior-king". This patronym is unattested, but the root, *arto-rīg, "bear/warrior-king", is the source of the Old Irish personal name Artrí. Some scholars have suggested it is relevant to this debate that the legendary King Arthur's name only appears as Arthur or Arturus in early Latin Arthurian texts, never as Artōrius (though Classical Latin Artōrius became Arturius in some Vulgar Latin dialects). Others believe the origin of the name Arthur, as Artōrius would regularly become Art(h)ur when borrowed into Welsh.

Another commonly proposed derivation of Arthur from Welsh arth "bear" + (g)wr "man" (earlier *Arto-uiros in Brittonic) is not accepted by modern scholars for phonological and orthographic reasons. Notably, a Brittonic compound name *Arto-uiros should produce Old Welsh *Artgur (where u represents the short vowel /u/) and Middle/Modern Welsh *Arthwr, rather than Arthur (where u is a long vowel /ʉː/). In Welsh poetry the name is always spelled Arthur and is exclusively rhymed with words ending in -ur—never words ending in -wr—which confirms that the second element cannot be [g]wr "man".

An alternative theory, which has gained only limited acceptance among professional scholars, derives the name Arthur from Arcturus, the brightest star in the constellation Boötes, near Ursa Major or the Great Bear. Classical Latin Arcturus would also have become Art(h)ur when borrowed into Welsh, and its brightness and position in the sky led people to regard it as the "guardian of the bear" (which is the meaning of the name in Ancient Greek) and the "leader" of the other stars in Boötes.

== Legends concerning the return of Arthur ==
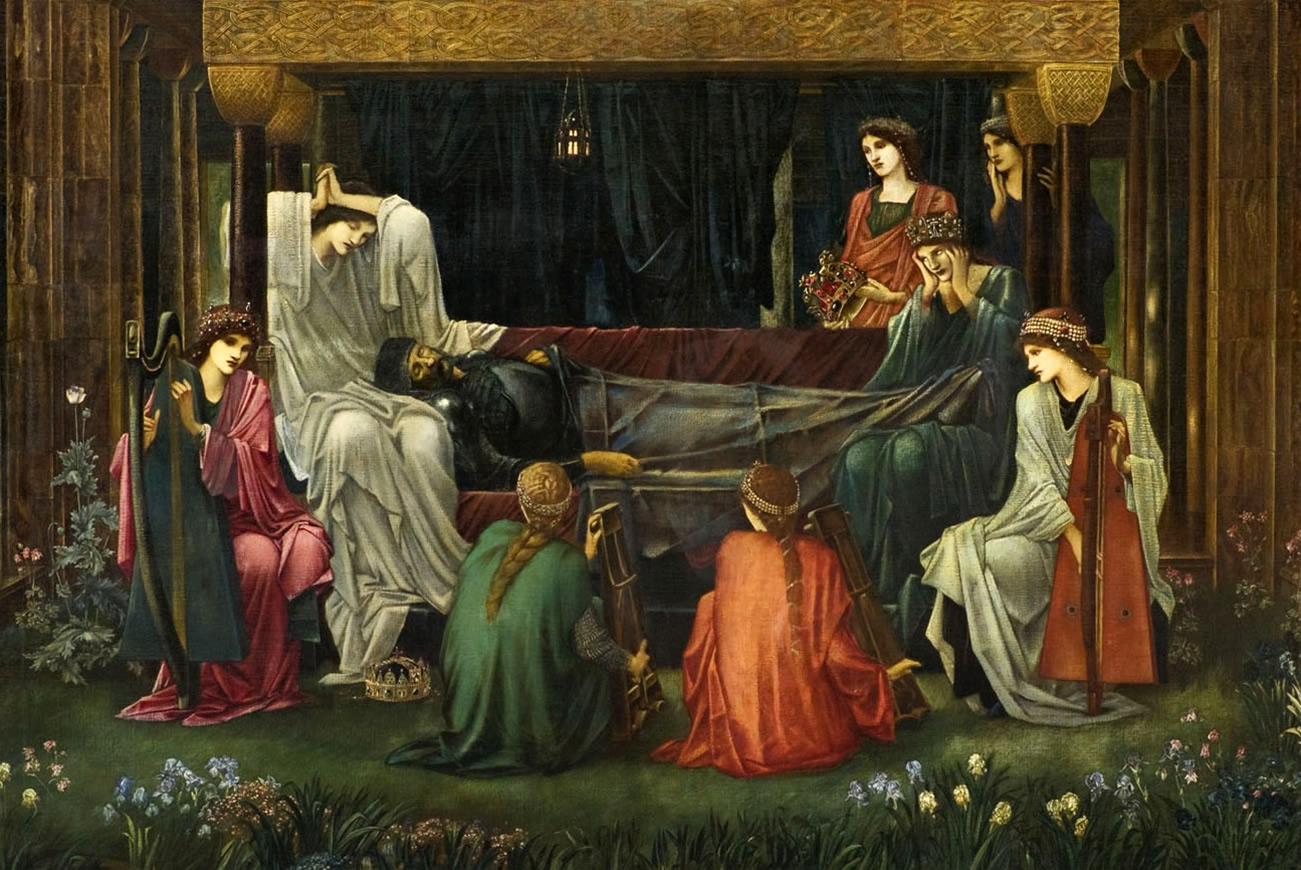
Detail of The Last Sleep of Arthur in Avalon (completed 1898), by Edward Burne-Jones. Arthur sleeping in Avalon, awaiting his return.

That Arthur never died but is awaiting his return in some remote spot, often sleeping, is a central motif connected to the Arthurian legends. Before the twelfth century there are, as in the Englynion y Beddau, references to the absence of a grave for Arthur suggesting that he was considered immortal and not dead, but in this poem there is no indication that he was expected to return. From the early twelfth century onwards several sources report a popular belief in the return of King Arthur, although most often critically and mockingly presented. His future return is first mentioned by William of Malmesbury in 1125: "But Arthur's grave is nowhere seen, whence antiquity of fables still claims that he will return." The "Miracles of St. Mary of Laon" (De miraculis sanctae Mariae Laudunensis), written by a French cleric and chronicler named Hériman of Tournai about 1145, but referring to events occurring in 1113, mentions the Breton and Cornish belief that Arthur still lived.

In 1191 the alleged tomb of Arthur was identified in an orchestrated discovery at Glastonbury Abbey. Whereas numerous scholars have argued that this could have been due to the Abbey wanting to stand out with an illustrious tomb, or to a desire of the Plantagenet regime to put an end to a legendary rival figure who inspired tenacious Celtic opposition to their rule, it may also have been motivated by how the Arthurian expectations were highly problematic to contemporary Christianity. The longing of the return of a mighty immortal figure returning before the end of time to re-establish his perfect rule, not only ran against basic Catholic tenets but could even threaten the quintessential focus on the longing for the return of Jesus. Decades of elite critique of the popular conviction among otherwise pious Catholic Celts in Britain and Brittany had done nothing to suppress these beliefs, whereas the orchestration of Arthur's physical remains effectively eliminated the possibility of his return without overtly criticizing anyone's beliefs. After the 1191 discovery of his alleged tomb, Arthur became more of a figure of folk legends, found sleeping in various remote caves all over Britain and some other places, and at times, roaming the night as a spectre, like in the Wild Hunt.

== Medieval literary traditions ==
The familiar literary persona of Arthur began with Geoffrey of Monmouth's pseudo-historical Historia Regum Britanniae (History of the Kings of Britain), written in the 1130s. The textual sources for Arthur are usually divided into those written before Geoffrey's Historia (known as pre-Galfridian texts, from the Latin form of Geoffrey, Galfridus) and those written afterwards, which could not avoid his influence (Galfridian, or post-Galfridian, texts).

=== Pre-Galfridian traditions ===
The earliest literary references to Arthur come from Welsh and Breton sources. There have been few attempts to define the nature and character of Arthur in the pre-Galfridian tradition as a whole, rather than in a single text or text/story-type. A 2007 academic survey led by Caitlin Green has identified three key strands to the portrayal of Arthur in this earliest material. The first is that he was a peerless warrior who functioned as the monster-hunting protector of Britain from all internal and external threats. Some of these are human threats, such as the Saxons he fights in the Historia Brittonum, but the majority are supernatural, including giant cat-monsters, destructive divine boars, dragons, dogheads, giants, and witches. The second is that the pre-Galfridian Arthur was a figure of folklore (particularly topographic or onomastic folklore) and localised magical wonder-tales, the leader of a band of superhuman heroes who live in the wilds of the landscape. The third and final strand is that the early Welsh Arthur had a close connection with the Welsh Otherworld, Annwn. On the one hand, he launches assaults on Otherworldly fortresses in search of treasure and frees their prisoners. On the other, his warband in the earliest sources includes former pagan gods, and his wife and his possessions are clearly Otherworldly in origin.

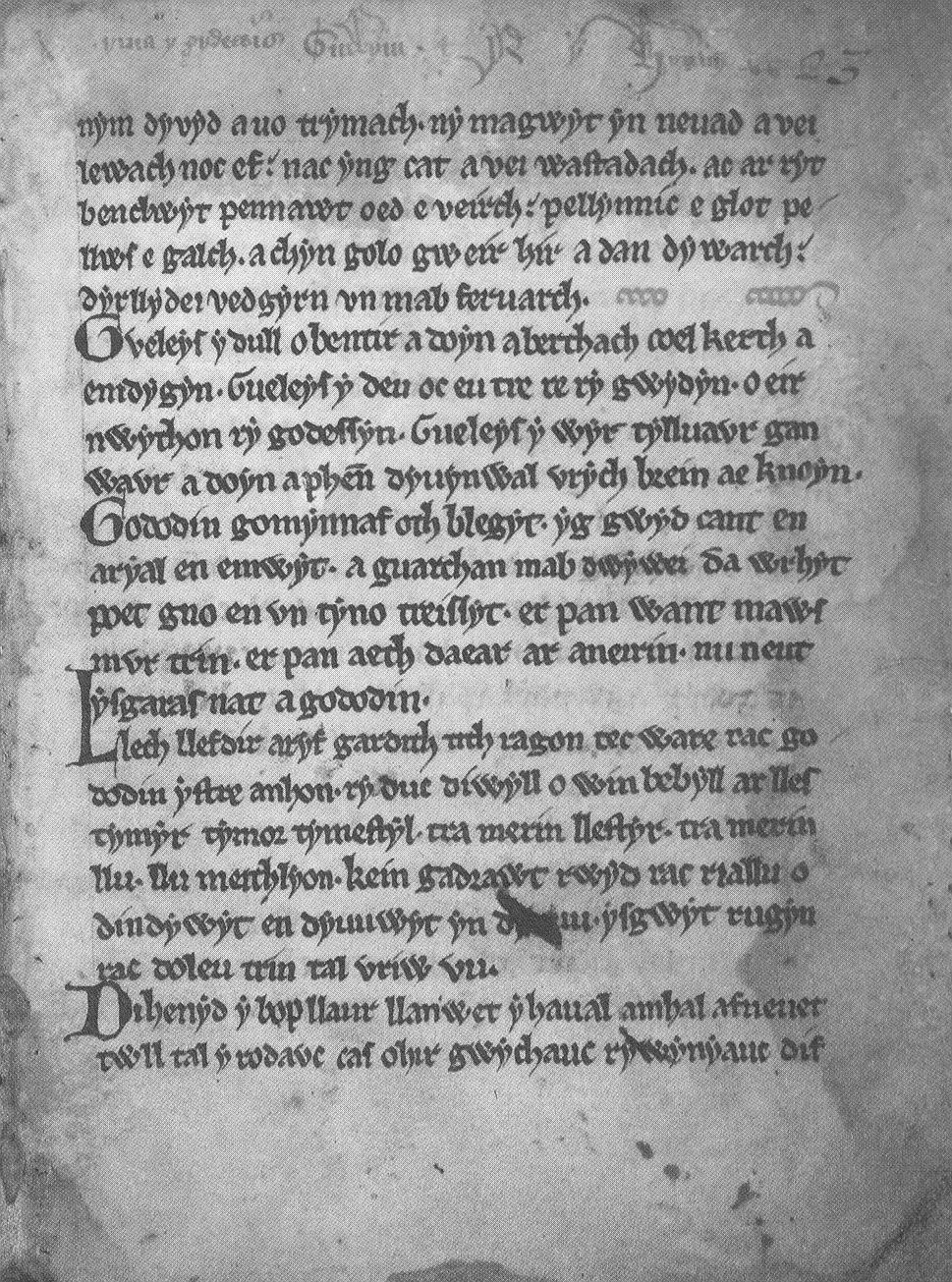
A page of Y Gododdin, one of the most famous early Welsh texts featuring Arthur (c. 1275)

A possible early reference to Arthur is in a collection of early Welsh poetry known as Y Gododdin, which includes a verse praising the feats of a warrior in battle but stating that nevertheless "he was not Arthur". The scholar John Koch dates the poem on linguistic grounds to the early seventh century. Historians disagree on the strength of Koch's arguments, and whether the reference to Arthur is a late interpolation. Even if he is in the oldest version of the poem, the comparison may have been to a mythical figure, similar to comparing a warrior to Achilles. Historians conclude that the poem can only show that Arthur was regarded as a great fighter by the tenth century. Several poems attributed to Taliesin, a poet said to have lived in the 6th century, also refer to Arthur, although these all probably date from between the 8th and 12th centuries. They include "Kadeir Teyrnon" ("The Chair of the Prince"), which refers to "Arthur the Blessed"; and "Preiddeu Annwn" ("The Spoils of Annwn"), which recounts an expedition of Arthur to the Otherworld; and "Marwnat vthyr pen[dragon]" ("The Elegy of Uther Pen[dragon]").

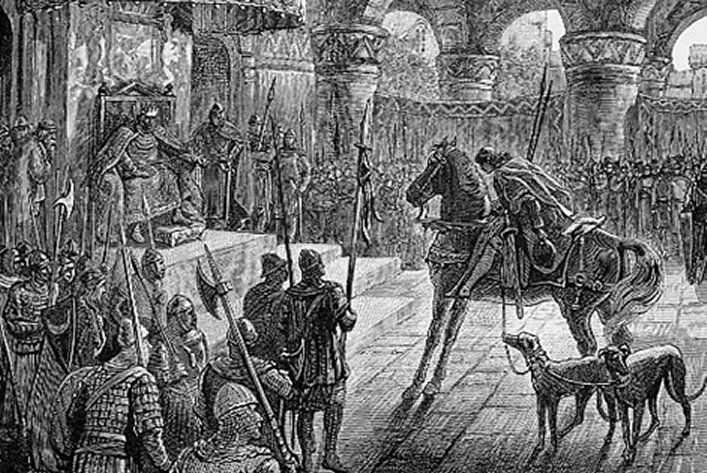
Culhwch entering Arthur's court in the Welsh tale Culhwch and Olwen. An illustration by Alfred Fredericks for an 1881 edition of the Mabinogion

Other early Welsh Arthurian texts include a poem found in the Black Book of Carmarthen, "Pa gur yv y porthaur?" ("What man is the gatekeeper?"). This takes the form of a dialogue between Arthur and the gatekeeper of a fortress he wishes to enter, in which Arthur recounts the names and deeds of himself and his men, notably Cei (Kay) and Bedwyr (Bedivere).

In addition to these pre-Galfridian Welsh poems and tales, Arthur appears in some other early Latin texts besides the Historia Brittonum and the Annales Cambriae. In particular, Arthur features in a number of well-known vitae ("hagiographies") of post-Roman saints, none of which are now generally considered to be reliable historical sources (the earliest probably dates from the 11th century). According to the Life of Saint Gildas, written in the early-12th century by Caradoc of Llancarfan, Arthur is said to have killed Gildas's brother Hueil and to have rescued his wife Gwenhwyfar from Glastonbury. (Note: On the Glastonbury tale and its Otherworldly antecedents, see Sims-Williams, 1991, pp. 58–61.) In the Life of Saint Cadoc, written around 1100 or a little before by Lifris of Llancarfan, the saint gives protection to a man who killed three of Arthur's soldiers, and Arthur demands a herd of cattle as wergeld for his men. Cadoc delivers them as demanded, but when Arthur takes possession of the animals, they turn into bundles of ferns. Arthur is also portayed in an unflattering light in the hagiographies of Carannog, Padarn and Efflamn. Arthur is also mentioned in William of Malmesbury's De Gestis Regum Anglorum and Herman's De Miraculis Sanctae Mariae Laudunensis, which together provide the first certain evidence for a belief that Arthur was not actually dead and would at some point return, a theme that is often revisited in post-Galfridian folklore.

=== Geoffrey of Monmouth ===
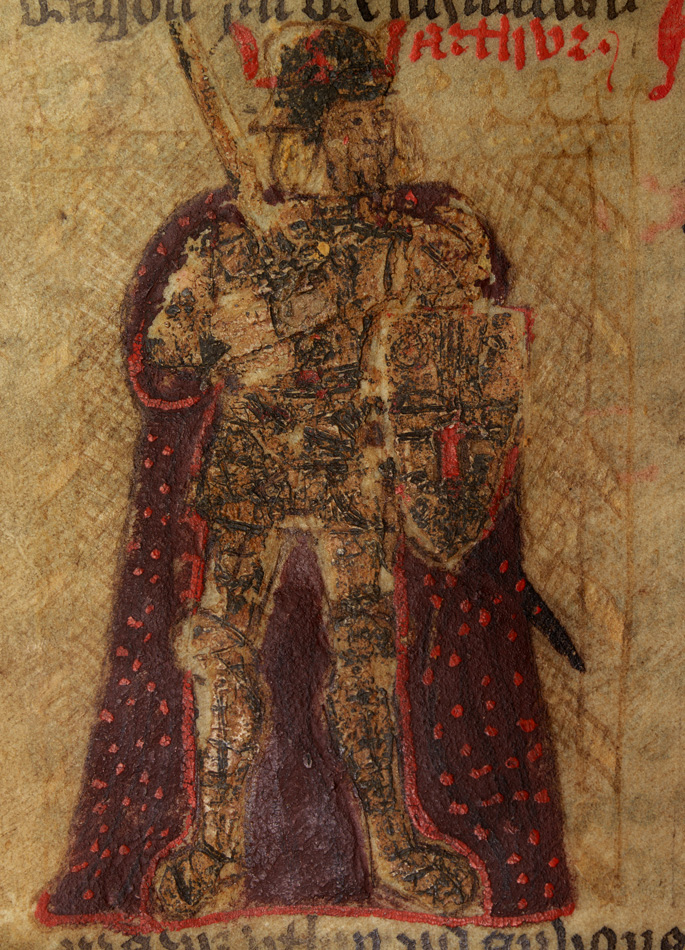
King Arthur in a 15th-century Welsh version of the Historia Regum Britanniae by Geoffrey of Monmouth

Geoffrey of Monmouth's Historia Regum Britanniae (History of the Kings of Britain), completed c. 1138, contains the first narrative account of Arthur's life. How much was Geoffrey's own invention is open to debate. He seems to have made use of the list of Arthur's twelve battles against the Saxons found in the 9th-century Historia Brittonum, along with the battle of Camlann from the Annales Cambriae and the idea that Arthur was still alive. Arthur's status as the king of all Britain seems to be borrowed from pre-Galfridian tradition, being found in Culhwch and Olwen, the Welsh Triads, and the saints' lives. Finally, Geoffrey borrowed many of the names for Arthur's possessions, close family, and companions from the pre-Galfridian Welsh tradition, including Kaius (Cei), Beduerus (Bedwyr), Guenhuuara (Gwenhwyfar), Uther (Uthyr) and perhaps also Caliburnus (Caledfwlch), the latter becoming Excalibur in subsequent Arthurian tales. However, while names, key events, and titles may have been borrowed, Brynley Roberts has argued that "the Arthurian section is Geoffrey's literary creation and it owes nothing to prior narrative." Geoffrey makes the Welsh Medraut into the villainous Modredus, but there is no trace of such a negative character for this figure in Welsh sources until the 16th century. There have been relatively few modern attempts to challenge the notion that the Historia Regum Britanniae is primarily Geoffrey's own work, with scholarly opinion often echoing William of Newburgh's late-12th-century comment that Geoffrey "made up" his narrative, perhaps through an "inordinate love of lying". Geoffrey Ashe is one dissenter from this view, believing that Geoffrey's narrative is partially derived from a lost source telling of the deeds of a 5th-century British king named Riotamus, this figure being the original Arthur, although historians and Celticists have been reluctant to follow Ashe in his conclusions.

Whatever his sources may have been, the immense popularity of Geoffrey's Historia Regum Britanniae cannot be denied. Well over 200 manuscript copies of Geoffrey's Latin work are known to have survived, as well as translations into other languages. For example, 60 manuscripts are extant containing the Brut y Brenhinedd, Welsh-language versions of the Historia, the earliest of which were created in the 13th century. The old notion that some of these Welsh versions actually underlie Geoffrey's Historia, advanced by antiquarians such as the 18th-century Lewis Morris, has long since been discounted in academic circles. As a result of this popularity, Geoffrey's Historia Regum Britanniae was enormously influential on the later medieval development of the Arthurian legend. While it was not the only creative force behind Arthurian romance, many of its elements were borrowed and developed (e.g., Merlin and the final fate of Arthur), and it provided the historical framework into which the romancers' tales of magical and wonderful adventures were inserted.

=== Romance traditions ===
The Welsh prose tale Culhwch and Olwen (latter half of the 12th century, included in the modern Mabinogion collection, has a much longer list of more than 200 of Arthur's men, though Cei and Bedwyr again take a central place. The story as a whole tells of Arthur helping his kinsman Culhwch win the hand of Olwen, daughter of Ysbaddaden Chief-Giant, by completing a series of apparently impossible tasks, including the hunt for the great semi-divine boar Twrch Trwyth. The 9th-century Historia Brittonum also refers to this tale, with the boar there named Troy(n)t. (Note: For a discussion of the tale, see Bromwich & Evans 1992; see also Padel 1994, pp. 2–4; Roberts 1991a; and Green 2007b, pp. 67–72 and chapter three.) Finally, Arthur is mentioned numerous times in the Welsh Triads, a collection of short summaries of Welsh tradition and legend which are classified into groups of three linked characters or episodes to assist recall. The later manuscripts of the Triads are partly derivative from Geoffrey of Monmouth and later continental traditions, but the earliest ones show no such influence and are usually agreed to refer to pre-existing Welsh traditions. Even in these, however, Arthur's court has started to embody legendary Britain as a whole, with "Arthur's Court" sometimes substituted for "The Island of Britain" in the formula "Three XXX of the Island of Britain". While it is not clear from the Historia Brittonum and the Annales Cambriae that Arthur was even considered a king, by the time Culhwch and Olwen and the Triads were written he had become Penteyrnedd yr Ynys hon, "Chief of the Lords of this Island", the overlord of Wales, Cornwall and the North.

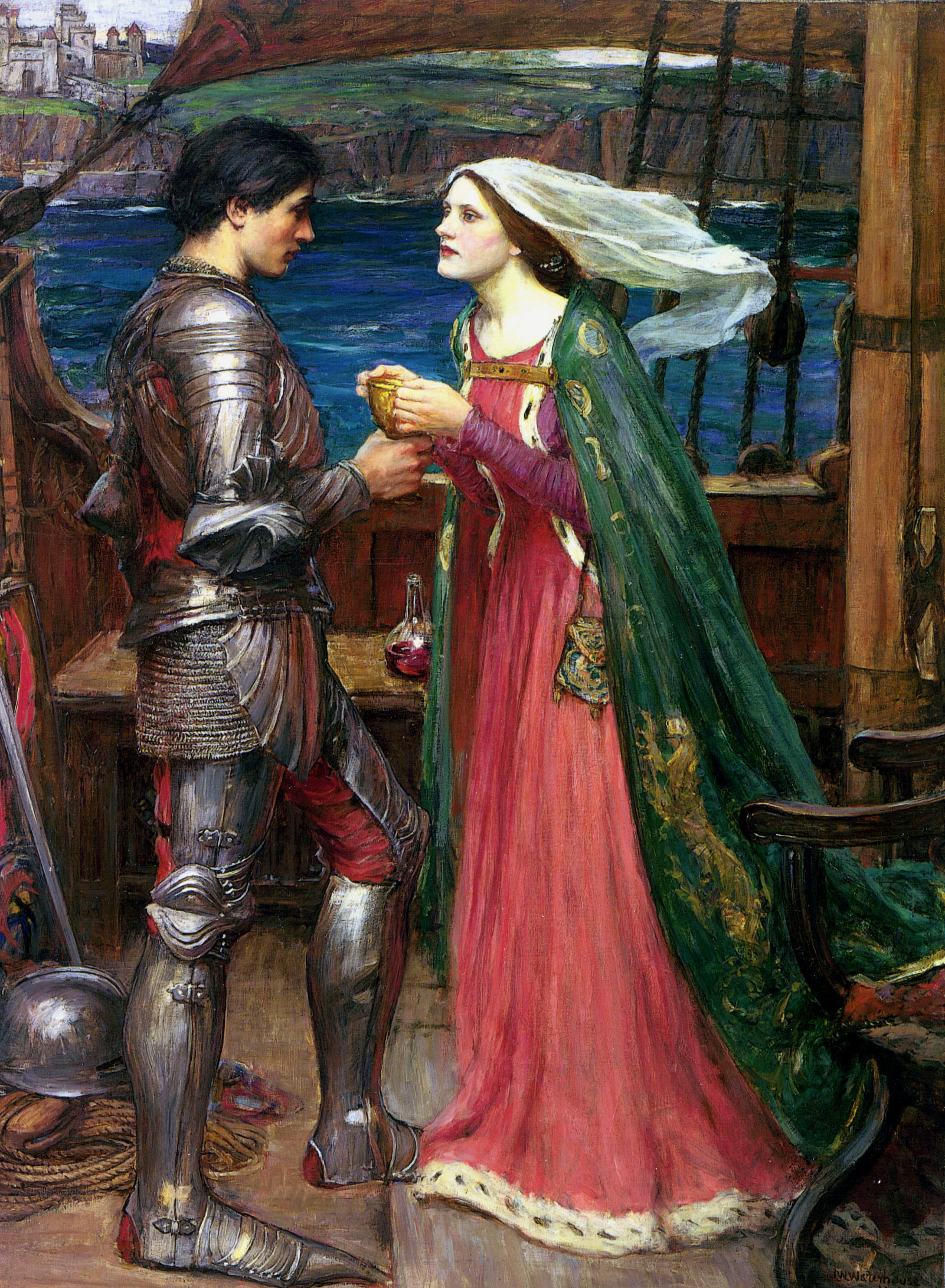
During the 12th century, Arthur's character began to be marginalised by the accretion of "Arthurian" side-stories such as that of Tristan and Iseult, here pictured in a painting by John William Waterhouse (1916)

During the ongoing conquest of Wales by Edward I of England, he attempted to make King Arthur a fundamentally English character and hero. The completion of the conquest was one of the factors that shifted storytellers away from the Welsh roots of the original tales.

The popularity of Geoffrey's Historia and its other derivative works (such as Wace's Roman de Brut) gave rise to a significant numbers of new Arthurian works in continental Europe during the 12th and 13th centuries, particularly in France. It was not, however, the only Arthurian influence on the developing "Matter of Britain". There is clear evidence that Arthur and Arthurian tales were familiar on the Continent before Geoffrey's work became widely known (see for example, the Modena Archivolt), and "Celtic" names and stories not found in Geoffrey's Historia appear in the Arthurian romances. From the perspective of Arthur, perhaps the most significant effect of this great outpouring of new Arthurian story was on the role of the king himself: much of this 12th-century and later Arthurian literature centres less on Arthur himself than on characters such as Lancelot and Guinevere, Percival, Galahad, Gawain, Ywain, and Tristan and Iseult. Whereas Arthur is very much at the centre of the pre-Galfridian material and Geoffrey's Historia itself, in the romances he is rapidly sidelined. His character also alters significantly. In both the earliest materials and Geoffrey he is a great and ferocious warrior, who laughs as he personally slaughters witches and giants and takes a leading role in all military campaigns, (Note: For example, Geoffrey of Monmouth, Historia Regum Britanniae, Book 10.3) whereas in the continental romances he becomes the roi fainéant, the "do-nothing king", whose "inactivity and acquiescence constituted a central flaw in his otherwise ideal society". Arthur's role in these works is frequently that of a wise, dignified, even-tempered, somewhat bland, and occasionally feeble monarch. So, he simply turns pale and silent when he learns of Lancelot's affair with Guinevere in the Mort Artu, whilst in Yvain, the Knight of the Lion, he is unable to stay awake after a feast and has to retire for a nap. Nonetheless, as Norris J. Lacy has observed, whatever his faults and frailties may be in these Arthurian romances, "his prestige is never—or almost never—compromised by his personal weaknesses ... his authority and glory remain intact." In the French prose, Perceforest, King Arthur is a descendant of Alexander the Great.

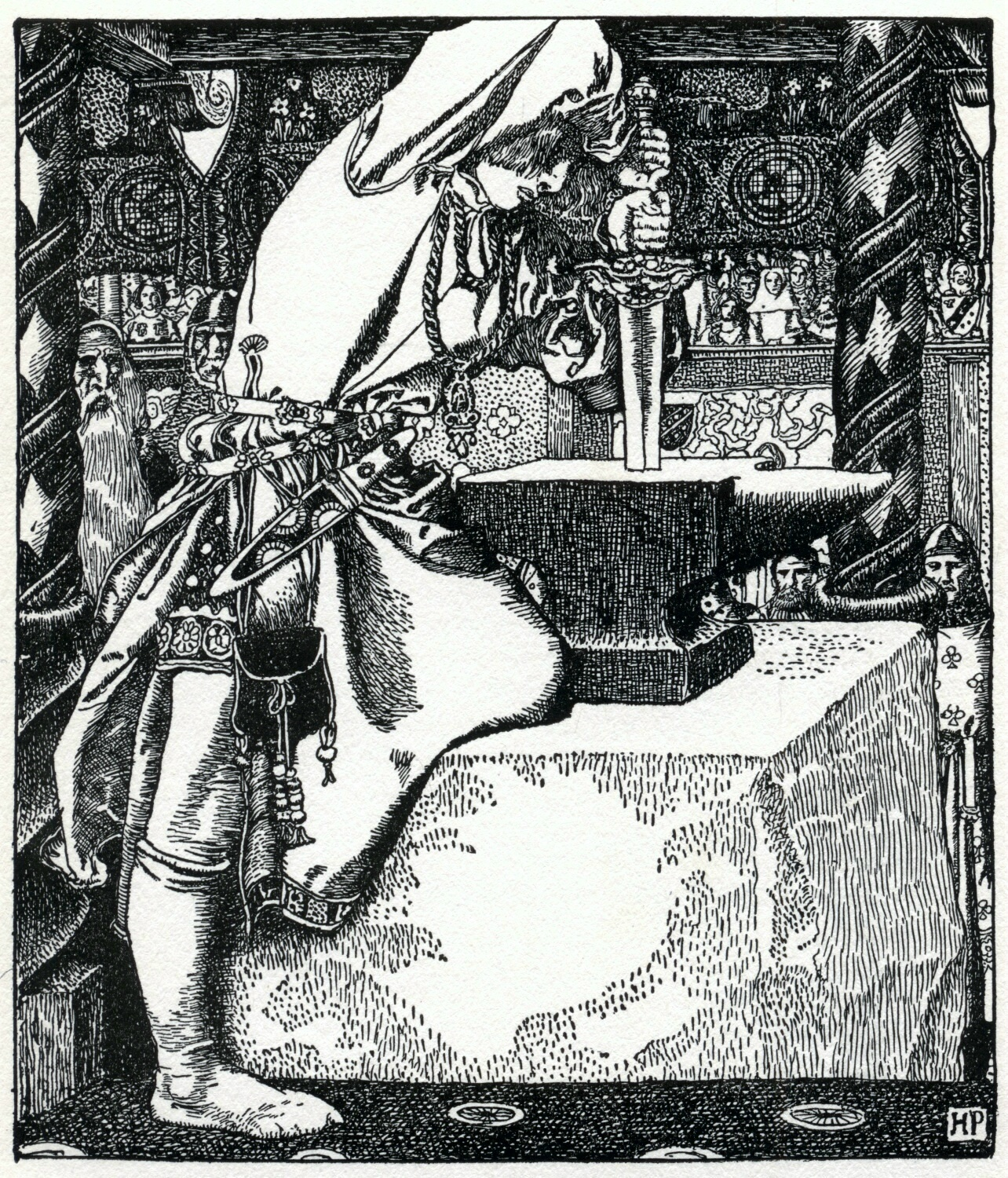
The story of Arthur drawing the sword from a stone appeared in Robert de Boron's 13th-century Merlin. By Howard Pyle (1903)

Arthur and his retinue appear in some of the Lais of Marie de France, but it was the work of another French poet, Chrétien de Troyes, that had the greatest influence with regard to the development of Arthur's character and legend. Chrétien wrote five Arthurian romances between c. 1170 and 1190. Erec and Enide and Cligès are tales of courtly love with Arthur's court as their backdrop, demonstrating the shift away from the heroic world of the Welsh and Galfridian Arthur, while Yvain, the Knight of the Lion, features Yvain and Gawain in a supernatural adventure, with Arthur very much on the sidelines and weakened. However, the most significant for the development of the Arthurian legend are Lancelot, the Knight of the Cart, which introduces Lancelot and his adulterous relationship with Arthur's queen Guinevere, extending and popularising the recurring theme of Arthur as a cuckold, and Perceval, the Story of the Grail, which introduces the Holy Grail and the Fisher King and which again sees Arthur having a much reduced role. Chrétien was thus "instrumental both in the elaboration of the Arthurian legend and in the establishment of the ideal form for the diffusion of that legend", and much of what came after him in terms of the portrayal of Arthur and his world built upon the foundations he had laid. Perceval, although unfinished, was particularly popular: four separate continuations of the poem appeared over the next half century, with the notion of the Grail and its quest being developed by other writers such as Robert de Boron, a fact that helped accelerate the decline of Arthur in continental romance. Similarly, Lancelot and his cuckolding of Arthur with Guinevere became one of the classic motifs of the Arthurian legend, although the Lancelot of the prose Lancelot (c. 1225) and later texts was a combination of Chrétien's character and that of Ulrich von Zatzikhoven's Lanzelet. Chrétien's work even appears to feed back into Welsh Arthurian literature, with the result that the romance Arthur began to replace the heroic, active Arthur in Welsh literary tradition. Particularly significant in this development were the three Welsh Arthurian romances, which are closely similar to those of Chrétien, albeit with some significant differences: Owain, or the Lady of the Fountain is related to Chrétien's Yvain; Geraint and Enid, to Erec and Enide; and Peredur son of Efrawg, to Perceval. (Note: It is not entirely certain what, exactly, the relationship is between these Welsh romances and Chrétien's works. See Koch 1996, pp. 280–288 for a survey of opinions.)

Up to c. 1210, continental Arthurian romance was expressed primarily through poetry; after this date the tales began to be told in prose. The most significant of these 13th-century prose romances was the Vulgate Cycle (also known as the Lancelot-Grail Cycle), a series of five Middle French prose works written in the first half of that century. These works were the Estoire del Saint Grail, the Estoire de Merlin, the Lancelot propre (or Prose Lancelot, which made up half the entire Vulgate Cycle on its own), the Queste del Saint Graal and the Mort Artu, which combine to form the first coherent version of the entire Arthurian legend. The cycle continued the trend towards reducing the role played by Arthur in his own legend, partly through the introduction of the character of Galahad and an expansion of the role of Merlin. It also made Mordred the result of an incestuous relationship between Arthur and his sister Morgause, and established the role of Camelot, first mentioned in passing in Chrétien's Lancelot, as Arthur's primary court. (Note: For a study of this cycle, see Burns 1985.) This series of texts was quickly followed by the Post-Vulgate Cycle (c. 1230–40), of which the Suite du Merlin is a part, which greatly reduced the importance of Lancelot's affair with Guinevere but continued to sideline Arthur, and to focus more on the Grail quest. As such, Arthur became even more of a relatively minor character in these French prose romances; in the Vulgate itself he only figures significantly in the Estoire de Merlin and the Mort Artu. During this period, Arthur was made one of the Nine Worthies, a group of three pagan, three Jewish and three Christian exemplars of chivalry. The Worthies were first listed in Jacques de Longuyon's Voeux du Paon in 1312, and subsequently became a common subject in literature and art.

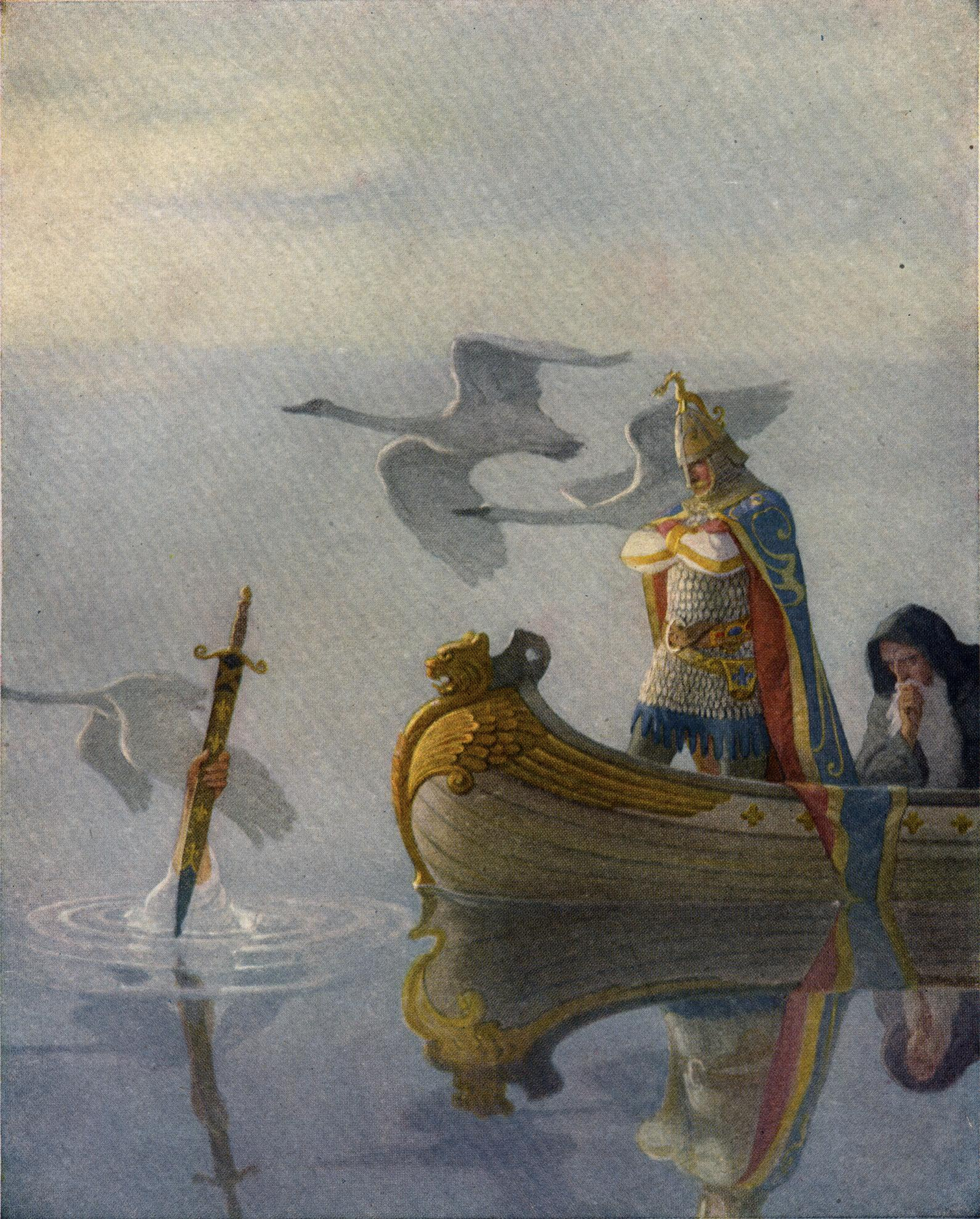
Arthur receiving the later tradition's sword Excalibur in N. C. Wyeth's illustration for The Boy's King Arthur (1922), a modern edition of Thomas Malory's 1485 Le Morte d'Arthur

The development of the medieval Arthurian cycle and the character of the "Arthur of romance" culminated in Le Morte d'Arthur (lit. 'The Death of Arthur'), Thomas Malory's retelling of the entire legend in a single work in English in the late-15th century. Malory based his book—originally titled The Whole Book of King Arthur and of His Noble Knights of the Round Table—on the various previous romance versions, in particular the Vulgate Cycle, and appears to have aimed at creating a comprehensive and authoritative collection of Arthurian stories. (Note: On Malory and his work, see Field 1993 and Field 1998.) Perhaps as a result of this, and the fact that Le Morte D'Arthur was one of the earliest printed books in England, published by William Caxton in 1485, most later Arthurian works are derivative of Malory's.

== Decline, revival, and the modern legend ==
=== Post-medieval literature ===
The end of the Middle Ages brought with it a waning of interest in King Arthur. Although Malory's English version of the great French romances was popular, there were increasing attacks upon the truthfulness of the historical framework of the Arthurian romances – established since Geoffrey of Monmouth's time – and thus the legitimacy of the whole Matter of Britain. So, for example, the 16th-century humanist scholar Polydore Vergil famously rejected the claim that Arthur was the ruler of a post-Roman empire, found throughout the post-Galfridian medieval "chronicle tradition", to the horror of Welsh and English antiquarians. Social changes associated with the end of the medieval period and the Renaissance also conspired to rob the character of Arthur and his associated legend of some of their power to enthrall audiences, with the result that 1634 saw the last printing of Malory's Le Morte d'Arthur for nearly 200 years. King Arthur and the Arthurian legend were not entirely abandoned, but until the early 19th century the material was taken less seriously and was often used simply as a vehicle for allegories of 17th- and 18th-century politics. Thus Richard Blackmore's epics Prince Arthur (1695) and King Arthur (1697) feature Arthur as an allegory for the struggles of William III against James II. Similarly, the most popular Arthurian tale throughout this period seems to have been that of Tom Thumb, which was told first through chapbooks and later through the political plays of Henry Fielding; although the action is clearly set in Arthurian Britain, the treatment is humorous and Arthur appears as a primarily comedic version of his romance character. John Dryden's masque King Arthur is still performed, largely thanks to Henry Purcell's music, though seldom unabridged.

=== Tennyson and the revival ===
In the early-19th century medievalism, Romanticism and the Gothic Revival reawakened interest in Arthur and the medieval romances. A new code of ethics for 19th-century gentlemen was shaped around the chivalric ideals embodied in the "Arthur of romance". This renewed interest first made itself felt in 1816, when Malory's Le Morte d'Arthur was reprinted for the first time since 1634. Initially, the medieval Arthurian legends were of particular interest to poets, inspiring, for example, William Wordsworth to write "The Egyptian Maid" (1835), an allegory of the Holy Grail. Pre-eminent among these was Alfred Tennyson, whose first Arthurian poem "The Lady of Shalott" was published in 1832. (Note: See Potwin 1902 for the sources that Tennyson used when writing this poem.) Arthur himself played a minor role in some of these works, following in the medieval romance tradition. Tennyson's Arthurian work reached its peak of popularity with Idylls of the King, however, which reworked the entire narrative of Arthur's life for the Victorian era. It was first published in 1859 and sold 10,000 copies within the first week. In the Idylls, Arthur became a symbol of ideal manhood who ultimately failed, through human weakness, to establish a perfect kingdom on earth. (Note: See Rosenberg 1973 and Taylor & Brewer 1983, pp. 89–128 for analyses of Idylls of the King.) Tennyson's works prompted a large number of imitators, generated considerable public interest in the legends of Arthur and the character himself, and brought Malory's tales to a wider audience.Simpson 1990 Indeed, the first modernisation of Malory's great compilation of Arthur's tales was published in 1862, shortly after Idylls appeared, and there were six further editions and five competitors before the century ended.

This interest in the "Arthur of romance" and his associated stories continued through the 19th century and into the 20th, and influenced poets such as William Morris and Pre-Raphaelite artists including Edward Burne-Jones. Even the humorous tale of Tom Thumb, which had been the primary manifestation of Arthur's legend in the 18th century, was rewritten after the publication of Idylls. While Tom maintained his small stature and remained a figure of comic relief, his story now included more elements from the medieval Arthurian romances and Arthur is treated more seriously and historically in these new versions. The revived Arthurian romance also proved influential in the United States, with such books as Sidney Lanier's The Boy's King Arthur (1880) reaching wide audiences and providing inspiration for Mark Twain's satire A Connecticut Yankee in King Arthur's Court (1889). Although the 'Arthur of romance' was sometimes central to these new Arthurian works (as he was in Burne-Jones's "The Sleep of Arthur in Avalon", 1881–1898), on other occasions he reverted to his medieval status and is either marginalised or even missing entirely, with Richard Wagner's Arthurian opera Parsifal providing a notable instance of the latter. Furthermore, the revival of interest in Arthur and the Arthurian tales did not continue unabated. By the end of the 19th century, it was confined mainly to Pre-Raphaelite imitators, and it could not avoid being affected by the First World War, which damaged the reputation of chivalry and thus interest in its medieval manifestations and Arthur as chivalric role model. The romance tradition did, however, remain sufficiently powerful to persuade Thomas Hardy, Laurence Binyon and John Masefield to compose Arthurian plays, and T. S. Eliot alludes to the Arthur myth (but not Arthur) in his poem The Waste Land, which mentions the Fisher King.

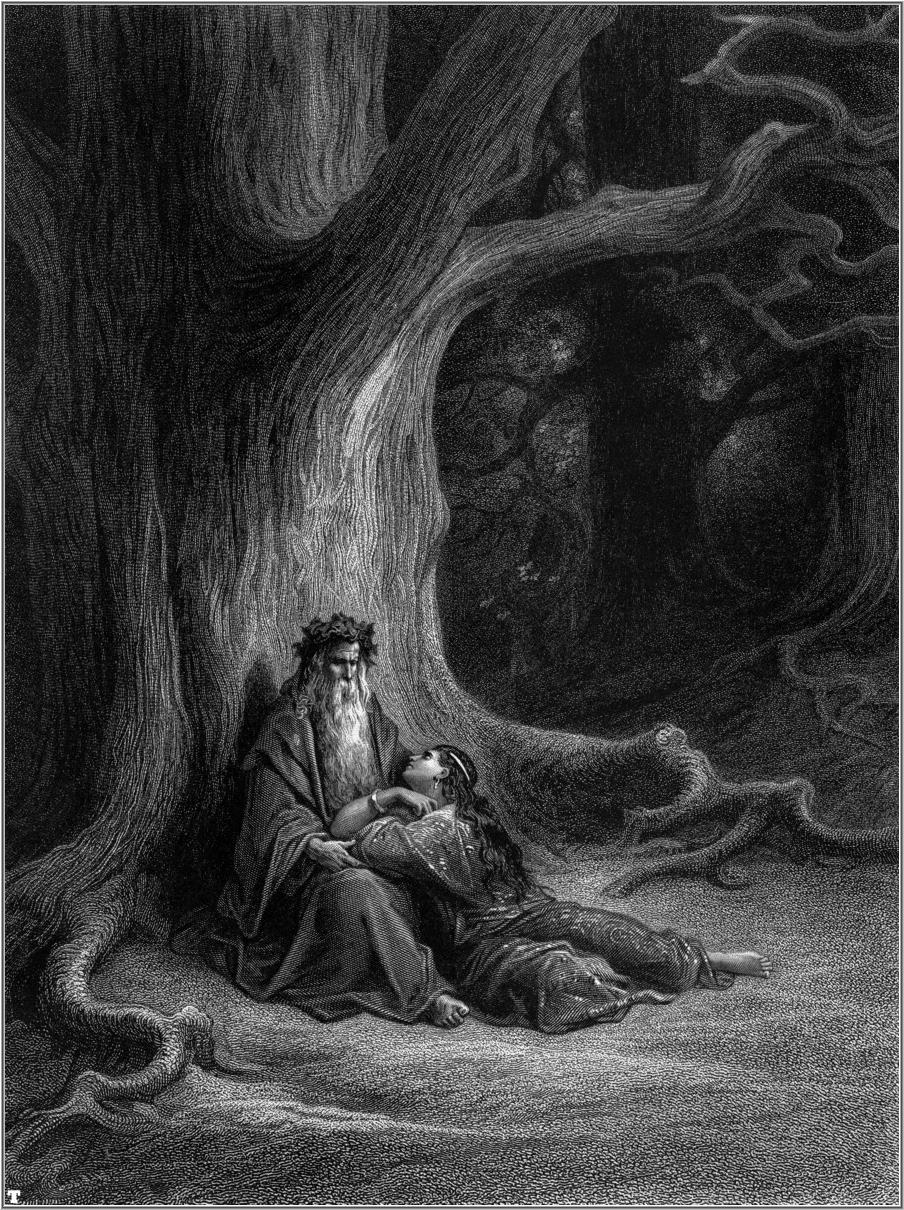
Merlin and Viviane in Gustave Doré's 1868 illustration for Alfred, Lord Tennyson's Idylls of the King

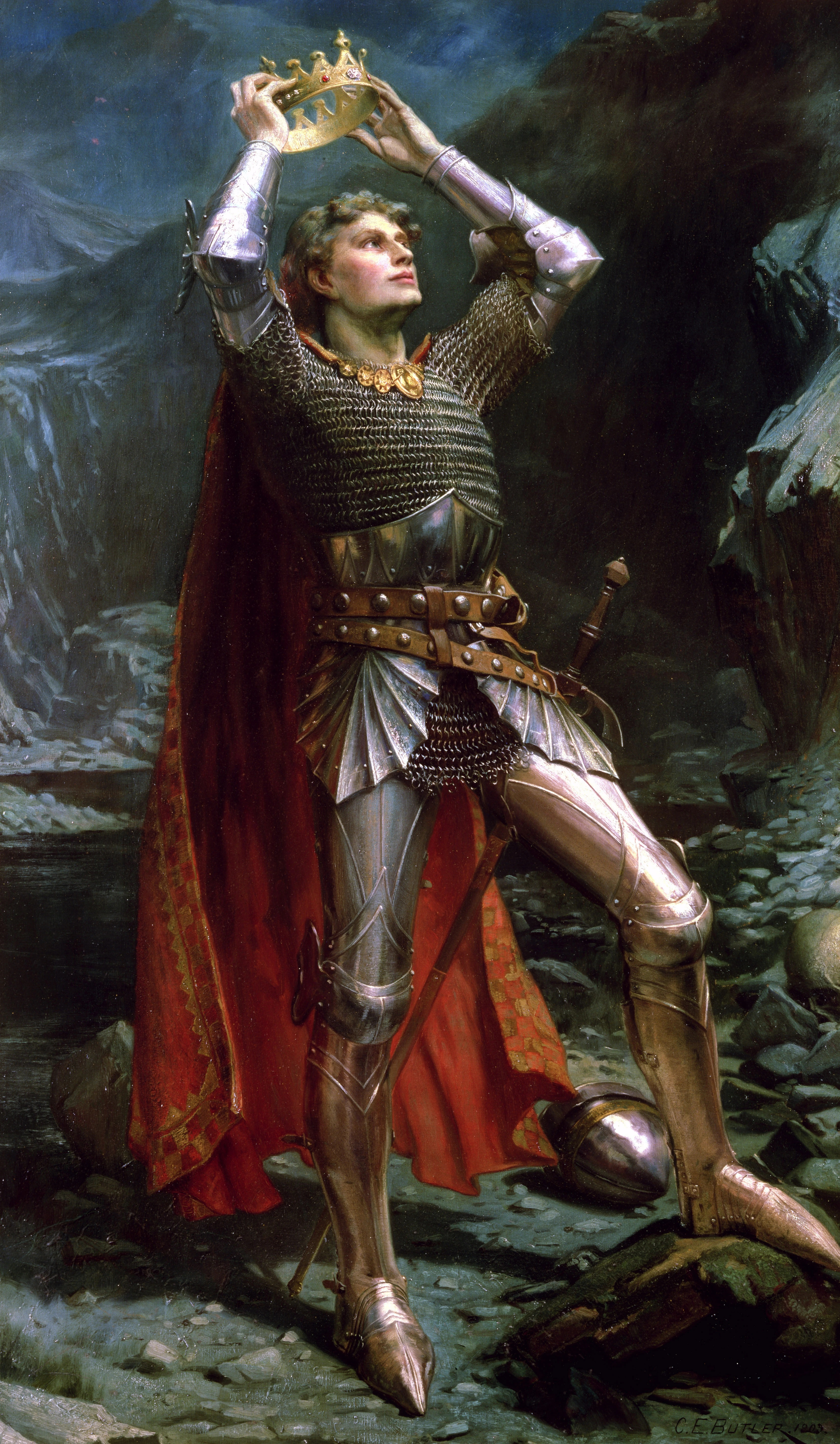
King Arthur by Charles Ernest Butler (1903)

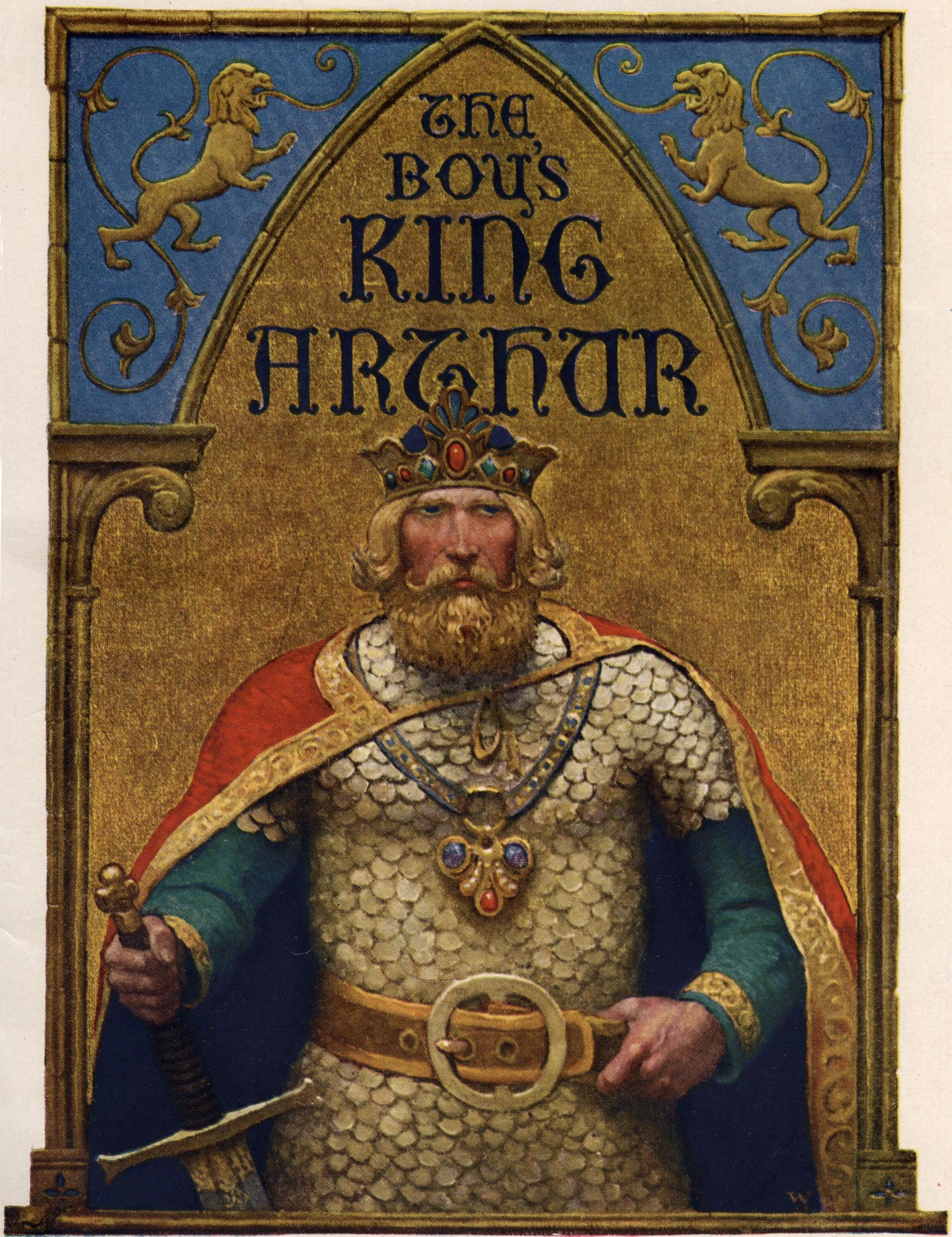
N. C. Wyeth's title page illustration for The Boy's King Arthur (1922)

=== Modern legend ===
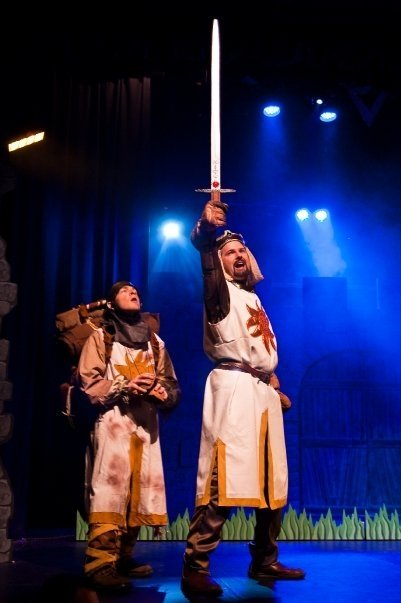
King Arthur (holding Excalibur) and Patsy in Spamalot, a stage musical adaptation of the 1975 comedy film Monty Python and the Holy Grail

In the latter half of the 20th century, the influence of the romance tradition of Arthur continued, through novels such as T. H. White's The Once and Future King (1958), Mary Stewart's The Crystal Cave (1970) and its four sequels, Thomas Berger's tragicomic Arthur Rex and Marion Zimmer Bradley's The Mists of Avalon (1982), in addition to comic strips such as Prince Valiant (from 1937 onward). Tennyson had reworked the romance tales of Arthur to suit and comment upon the issues of his day, and the same is often the case with modern treatments too. Mary Stewart's first three Arthurian novels present the wizard Merlin as the central character, rather than Arthur, and The Crystal Cave is narrated by Merlin in the first person, whereas Bradley's tale takes a feminist approach to Arthur and his legend, in contrast to the narratives of Arthur found in medieval materials. American authors often rework the story of Arthur to be more consistent with values such as equality and democracy. In John Cowper Powys's Porius: A Romance of the Dark Ages (1951), set in Wales in 499, just prior to the Saxon invasion, Arthur, the Emperor of Britain, is only a minor character. Myrddin's disappearance at the end of the novel is, "in the tradition of magical hibernation when the king or mage leaves his people for some island or cave to return either at a more propitious or more dangerous time", (see King Arthur's messianic return).

The romance Arthur has become popular in film and theatre as well. T. H. White's novel was adapted into the Lerner and Loewe stage musical Camelot (1960) and Walt Disney's animated film The Sword in the Stone (1963); Camelot, with its focus on the love of Lancelot and Guinevere and the cuckolding of Arthur, was itself made into a film of the same name in 1967. The romance tradition of Arthur is particularly evident and in critically respected films like Robert Bresson's Lancelot du Lac (1974), Éric Rohmer's Perceval le Gallois (1978) and John Boorman's Excalibur (1981); it is also the main source of the material used in the Arthurian spoof Monty Python and the Holy Grail (1975).

Retellings and reimaginings of the romance tradition are not the only important aspect of the modern legend of King Arthur. Attempts to portray Arthur as a genuine historical figure of c. 500, stripping away the "romance", have also emerged. As Taylor and Brewer have noted, this return to the medieval "chronicle tradition" of Geoffrey of Monmouth and the Historia Brittonum is a recent trend which became dominant in Arthurian literature in the years following the outbreak of the Second World War, when Arthur's legendary resistance to Germanic enemies struck a chord in Britain. Clemence Dane's series of radio plays, The Saviours (1942), used a historical Arthur to embody the spirit of heroic resistance against desperate odds, and Robert Sherriff's play The Long Sunset (1955) saw Arthur rallying Romano-British resistance against the Germanic invaders. This trend towards placing Arthur in a historical setting is also apparent in historical and fantasy novels published during this period. (Note: For example: Rosemary Sutcliff's The Lantern Bearers (1959) and Sword at Sunset (1963); Mary Stewart's The Crystal Cave (1970) and its sequels; Parke Godwin's Firelord (1980) and its sequels; Stephen Lawhead's The Pendragon Cycle (1987–99); Nikolai Tolstoy's The Coming of the King (1988); Jack Whyte's The Camulod Chronicles (1992–97); and Bernard Cornwell's The Warlord Chronicles (1995–97). See List of books about King Arthur.)

Arthur has also been used as a model for modern-day behaviour. In the 1930s, the Order of the Fellowship of the Knights of the Round Table was formed in Britain to promote Christian ideals and Arthurian notions of medieval chivalry. In the United States, hundreds of thousands of boys and girls joined Arthurian youth groups, such as the Knights of King Arthur, in which Arthur and his legends were promoted as wholesome exemplars. However, Arthur's diffusion within modern culture goes beyond such Arthurian endeavours, with Arthurian names being regularly attached to objects, buildings, and places. As Norris J. Lacy has observed, "The popular notion of Arthur appears to be limited, not surprisingly, to a few motifs and names, but there can be no doubt of the extent to which a legend born many centuries ago is profoundly embedded in modern culture at every level."

== See also ==
- Arthur's O'on
- Artus Court
- Bibliography of King Arthur
- King Arthur's family
- King Arthur's messianic return
- List of Arthurian characters
- List of legendary kings of Britain
- List of works based on Arthurian legends
- Galgano Guidotti
- Arthurian Narrative in the Latin Tradition by Siân Echard

== Sources ==
- Anderson, Graham (2004). King Arthur in Antiquity. London, UK: Routledge. ISBN 978-0-415-31714-6.
- Ashe, Geoffrey (1985). The Discovery of King Arthur. Garden City, NY: Anchor Press/Doubleday. ISBN 978-0-385-19032-9.
- Ashe, Geoffrey (1996). "Geoffrey of Monmouth". In Lacy, Norris (ed.). The New Arthurian Encyclopedia. New York: Garland. pp. 179–182. ISBN 978-1-56865-432-4.
- Ashe, Geoffrey (1968). "The Visionary Kingdom". In Ashe, Geoffrey (ed.). The Quest for Arthur's Britain. London: Granada. ISBN 0-586-08044-9.
- Barber, Richard (1986). King Arthur: Hero and Legend. Woodbridge, UK: Boydell Press. ISBN 0-85115-254-6.
- Barber, Richard (2004). The Holy Grail: Imagination and Belief. London: Allen Lane. ISBN 978-0-7139-9206-9.
- Berard, Christopher M. (2016). "King Arthur and the Canons of Laon". Arthuriana. 26 (3): 91–119. doi:10.1353/art.2016.0039.
- Binyon, Laurence (1923). Arthur: A Tragedy. London: Heinemann. OCLC 17768778.
- Bradley, Marion Zimmer (1982). The Mists of Avalon. New York: Knopf. ISBN 978-0-394-52406-1.
- Breeze, Andrew (September 2015). "The Historical Arthur and Sixth-Century Scotland". Northern History. LII (2): 158–181. doi:10.1179/0078172x15z.00000000085. S2CID 161217897.
- Breeze, Andrew (2020). British Battles 493–937: Mount Badon to Brunanburh. London, UK: Anthem Press. ISBN 978-1-78527-223-3.
- Bromwich, Rachel (1978). Trioedd Ynys Prydein: The Welsh Triads (2nd ed.). Cardiff: University of Wales Press. ISBN 978-0-7083-0690-1.
- Bromwich, Rachel (1983). "Celtic Elements in Arthurian Romance: A General Survey". In Grout, P. B.; Diverres, Armel Hugh (eds.). The Legend of Arthur in the Middle Ages. Woodbridge: Boydell and Brewer. pp. 41–55. ISBN 978-0-85991-132-0.
- Bromwich, Rachel (1991). "First Transmission to England and France". In Bromwich, Rachel; Jarman, A. O. H.; Roberts, Brynley F. (eds.). The Arthur of the Welsh. Cardiff: University of Wales Press. pp. 273–298. ISBN 978-0-7083-1107-3.
- Bromwich, Rachel; Evans, D. Simon (1992). Culhwch and Olwen. An Edition and Study of the Oldest Arthurian Tale. Cardiff: University of Wales Press. ISBN 978-0-7083-1127-1.
- Brooke, Christopher N. L. (1986). The Church and the Welsh Border in the Central Middle Ages. Woodbridge: Boydell. ISBN 978-0-85115-175-5.
- Budgey, A. (1992). "'Preiddeu Annwn' and the Welsh Tradition of Arthur". In Byrne, Cyril J.; Harry, Margaret Rose; Ó Siadhail, Padraig (eds.). Celtic Languages and Celtic People: Proceedings of the Second North American Congress of Celtic Studies, held in Halifax, August 16–19, 1989. Halifax, Nova Scotia: D'Arcy McGee Chair of Irish Studies, Saint Mary's University. pp. 391–404. ISBN 978-0-9696252-0-9.
- Bullock-Davies, C. (1982). "Exspectare Arthurum, Arthur and the Messianic Hope". Bulletin of the Board of Celtic Studies (29): 432–440.
- Burgess, Glyn S.; Busby, Keith, eds. (1999). The Lais of Marie de France (2nd ed.). London: Penguin. ISBN 978-0-14-044759-0.
- Burns, E. Jane (1985). Arthurian Fictions: Re-reading the Vulgate Cycle. Columbus: Ohio State University Press. ISBN 978-0-8142-0387-3.
- Carley, J. P. (1984). "Polydore Vergil and John Leland on King Arthur: The Battle of the Books". Arthurian Interpretations (15): 86–100.
- Carley, James P. (2001). Glastonbury Abbey and the Arthurian Tradition. Woodbridge: D.S. Brewer. ISBN 978-0859915724.
- Charles-Edwards, Thomas M. (1991). "The Arthur of History". In Bromwich, Rachel; Jarman, A. O. H.; Roberts, Brynley F. (eds.). The Arthur of the Welsh. Cardiff: University of Wales Press. pp. 15–32. ISBN 978-0-7083-1107-3.
- Coates, C. A. (1982). John Cowper Powys in Search of a Landscape. New York: Simon and Schuster. ISBN 9780389201915.
- Coe, John B.; Young, Simon (1995). The Celtic Sources for the Arthurian Legend. Felinfach, Lampeter: Llanerch. ISBN 978-1-897853-83-2.
- Crick, Julia C. (1989). The 'Historia regum Britanniae' of Geoffrey of Monmouth. 3: A Summary Catalogue of the Manuscripts. Cambridge: Brewer. ISBN 978-0-85991-213-6.
- Crick, Julia (1999). "The British Past and the Welsh Future: Gerald of Wales, Geoffrey of Monmouth and Arthur of Britain". Celtica. 23: 60–75.
- David, Brian (2019). "Review of Nicholas J. Higham, King Arthur: The Making of the Legend". Comitatus: A Journal of Medieval and Renaissance Studies. 50: 221–222. doi:10.1353/cjm.2019.0021. Project MUSE 734087
- Davies, John (1993). A history of Wales. Internet Archive. Allen Lane the Penguin Press. ISBN 978-0-7139-9098-0.
- Dumville, D. N. (1977). "Sub-Roman Britain: History and Legend". History. 62 (205): 173–192. doi:10.1111/j.1468-229X.1977.tb02335.x.
- Dumville, D. N. (1986). "The Historical Value of the Historia Brittonum". Arthurian Literature (6): 1–26.
- Eliot, Thomas Stearns (1949). The Waste Land and Other Poems. London: Faber and Faber. OCLC 56866661.
- Endsjø, Dag Øistein (2024). "Immortality, Space, and the Subtle Heresy of Arthurian Expectations". The Journal of Religious History, Literature and Culture. 10 (1): 1–36. doi:10.16922/jrhlc.10.1.1.
- Field, P. J. C. (1993). The Life and Times of Sir Thomas Malory. Cambridge: Brewer. ISBN 978-0-585-16570-7.
- Field, P. J. C. (1998). Malory: Texts and Sources. Cambridge: Brewer. ISBN 978-0-85991-536-6.
- Gilchrist, Roberta; Green, Cheryl (2015). Glastonbury Abbey: Archeological Investigations 1904–79. London: Society of Antiquaries of London. ISBN 978-0854313006.
- Gransden, Antonia (1976). "The Growth of the Glastonbury Legends and Traditions in the Twelfth Century'". The Journal of Ecclesiastical History. 27: 337–358. doi:10.1017/S0022046900052131.
- Green, Caitlin (2009). "The Historicity and Historicisation of Arthur". Arthuriana.
- Green, Thomas (August 2007a). "Tom Thumb and Jack the Giant Killer: Two Arthurian Fairytales?". Folklore. 118 (2): 123–140. doi:10.1080/00155870701337296. S2CID 161588264. (Caitlin Green writing as Thomas Green)
- Green, Thomas (2007b). Concepts of Arthur. Stroud: Tempus. ISBN 978-0-7524-4461-1. (Caitlin Green writing as Thomas Green)
- Halsall, Guy (2013). Worlds of Arthur: Facts & Fictions of the Dark Ages. Oxford, UK: Oxford University Press. ISBN 978-0-19-870084-5.
- Hannan, Martin (6 March 2015). "Academia up in arms over King Arthur's Glasgow roots". The National. ISSN 2057-231X.
- Hardy, Thomas (1923). The Famous Tragedy of the Queen of Cornwall at Tintagel in Lyonnesse: A New Version of an Old Story Arranged as a Play for Mummers, in One Act, Requiring No Theatre or Scenery. London: Macmillan. OCLC 1124753.
- Harty, Kevin J. (1996). "Films". In Lacy, Norris J. (ed.). The New Arthurian Encyclopedia. New York: Garland. pp. 152–155. ISBN 978-1-56865-432-4.
- Harty, Kevin J. (1997). "Arthurian Film". Arthuriana/Camelot Project Bibliography. Archived from the original on 24 May 2008.
- Haycock, M. (1983–1984). "Preiddeu Annwn and the Figure of Taliesin". Studia Celtica' (18/19): 52–78.
- Haycock, M. (2007). Legendary Poems from the Book of Taliesin. Aberystwyth: CMCS. ISBN 978-0-9527478-9-5.
- Higham, N. J. (2002). King Arthur, Myth-Making and History. London: Routledge. ISBN 978-0-415-21305-9.
- Higham, Nicholas J. (2018). King Arthur: the making of the legend. New Haven: Yale University Press. ISBN 978-0-300-21092-7.
- Hutton, Ronald (2003). Witches, Druids and King Arthur. London: Hambledon. ISBN 978-1852853976.
- Jones, Gwyn; Jones, Thomas, eds. (1949). The Mabinogion. London: Dent. OCLC 17884380.
- Jarman, A. O., ed. (1982). Llyfr Du Caerfyrddin. University of Wales Press. ISBN 978-0-7083-0629-1.
- Johnson, Flint (2002). The British Sources of the Abduction and Grail Romances. University Press of America.
- Kibler, William; Carroll, Carleton W., eds. (1991). Chrétien de Troyes: Arthurian Romances. London: Penguin. ISBN 978-0-14-044521-3.
- "King Arthur (from the Heroes Tapestries)". The Metropolitan Museum of Art. New York. c. 1400.
- Koch, John T. (1996). "The Celtic Lands". In Lacy, Norris J. (ed.). Medieval Arthurian Literature: A Guide to Recent Research. New York: Garland. pp. 239–322. ISBN 978-0-8153-2160-6.
- Koch, John T.; Carey, John (1994). The Celtic Heroic Age: Literary Sources for Ancient Celtic Europe and Early Ireland and Wales. Malden, MA: Celtic Studies Publications. ISBN 978-0-9642446-2-7.
- Koch, John T. (2006). Celtic Culture: A Historical Encyclopedia. Santa Barbara, CA: ABC-CLIO. ISBN 1851094407.
- McClure, Judith; Collins, Roger, eds. (1994). Bede: The Ecclesiastical History of the English People. Oxford, UK: Oxford University Press. ISBN 978-0-19-953723-5.
- Lacy, Norris J. (1992–1996). Lancelot-Grail: The Old French Arthurian Vulgate and Post-Vulgate in Translation. New York: Garland. ISBN 978-0-8153-0757-0. 5 vols.
- Lacy, Norris J. (1996a). "Character of Arthur". In Lacy, Norris J. (ed.). The New Arthurian Encyclopedia. New York: Garland. pp. 16–17. ISBN 978-1-56865-432-4.
- Lacy, Norris J. (1996b). "Chrétien de Troyes". In Lacy, Norris J. (ed.). The New Arthurian Encyclopedia. New York: Garland. pp. 88–91. ISBN 978-1-56865-432-4.
- Lacy, Norris J. (1996c). "Nine Worthies". In Lacy, Norris J. (ed.). The New Arthurian Encyclopedia. New York: Garland. p. 344. ISBN 978-1-56865-432-4.
- Lacy, Norris J. (1996d). "Popular Culture". In Lacy, Norris J. (ed.). The New Arthurian Encyclopedia. New York: Garland. pp. 363–364. ISBN 978-1-56865-432-4.
- Lagorio, V. M. (1996). "Bradley, Marion Zimmer". In Lacy, Norris J. (ed.). The New Arthurian Encyclopedia. New York: Garland. p. 57. ISBN 978-1-56865-432-4.
- Lanier, Sidney, ed. (1881). The Boy's Mabinogion: being the earliest Welsh tales of King Arthur in the famous Red Book of Hergest. Illustrated by Alfred Fredericks. New York: Charles Scribner's Sons.
- Lanier, Sidney, ed. (1880). The Boy's King Arthur: Sir Thomas Malory's History of King Arthur and His Knights of the Round Table. Illustrated by N.C. Wyeth. New York: Charles Scribner's Sons.
- Loomis, Roger Sherman (1956). "The Arthurian Legend before 1139". In Loomis, Roger Sherman (ed.). Wales and the Arthurian Legend. Cardiff: University of Wales Press. pp. 179–220. OCLC 2792376.
- Lupack, Alan; Lupack, Barbara (1991). King Arthur in America. Cambridge: D. S. Brewer. ISBN 978-0-85991-543-4.
- Lupack, Alan (2002). "Preface". In Sklar, Elizabeth Sherr; Hoffman, Donald L. (eds.). King Arthur in Popular Culture. Jefferson, NC: McFarland. pp. 1–3. ISBN 978-0-7864-1257-0.
- Malone, Kemp (May 1925). "Artorius". Modern Philology. 22 (4): 367–374. doi:10.1086/387553. JSTOR 433555. S2CID 224832996.
- Mancoff, Debra N. (1990). The Arthurian Revival in Victorian Art. New York: Garland. ISBN 978-0-8240-7040-3.
- Masefield, John (1927). Tristan and Isolt: A Play in Verse. London: Heinemann. OCLC 4787138.
- Merriman, James Douglas (1973). The Flower of Kings: A Study of the Arthurian Legend in England Between 1485 and 1835. Lawrence: University of Kansas Press. ISBN 978-0-7006-0102-8.
- Moore, Steven (2010). Novel: An Alternative History: Beginnings to 1600. Bloomsbury Academic. p. 232.
- Morris, John (1973). The Age of Arthur: A History of the British Isles from 350 to 650. New York: Scribner. ISBN 978-0-684-13313-3.
- Morris, Rosemary (1982). The Character of King Arthur in Medieval Literature. Cambridge: Brewer. ISBN 978-0-8476-7118-2.
- Myres, J. N. L. (1986). The English Settlements. Oxford: Oxford University Press. ISBN 978-0-19-282235-2.
- Padel, O. J. (1994). "The Nature of Arthur". Cambrian Medieval Celtic Studies (27): 1–31.
- Padel, O. J. (Fall 1995). "Recent Work on the Origins of the Arthurian Legend: A Comment". Arthuriana. 5 (3): 103–14. doi:10.1353/art.1995.0040. S2CID 32369325.
- Padel, O. J. (2000). Arthur in Medieval Welsh Literature. Cardiff: University of Wales Press. ISBN 978-0-7083-1682-5.
- Parins, Marylyn Jackson (1995). Sir Thomas Malory: The Critical Heritage. London: Routledge. ISBN 978-0-415-13400-2.
- Peyton, H.H. (1973). "The Myth of King Arthur's Immortality". Interpretations. 5 (1): 55–71.
- Phillips, Graham; Keatman, Martin (1992). King Arthur: The True Story. London: Century. ISBN 978-0-7126-5580-4.
- Potwin, L. S. (1902). "The Source of Tennyson's 'The Lady of Shalott'". Modern Language Notes. 17 (8). Modern Language Notes, Vol. 17, No. 8: 237–239. doi:10.2307/2917812. JSTOR 2917812.
- Powys, John Cowper (2007) [1951]. Porius. New York: Overlook Duckworth.
- Pryor, Francis (2004). Britain AD: A Quest for England, Arthur, and the Anglo-Saxons. London: HarperCollins. ISBN 978-0-00-718186-5.
- Pyle, Howard (1903). The Story of King Arthur and His Knights. Illustrated by Howard Pyle. New York: Charles Scribner's Sons.
- Reno, Frank D. (1996). The Historic King Arthur: Authenticating the Celtic Hero of Post-Roman Britain. Jefferson, NC: McFarland. ISBN 978-0-7864-0266-3.
- Roach, William, ed. (1949–1983). The Continuations of the Old French 'Perceval' of Chrétien de Troyes. Philadelphia: University of Pennsylvania Press. OCLC 67476613. 5 vols.
- Roberts, Brynley F. (1980). Brut Tysilio: darlith agoriadol gan Athro y Gymraeg a'i Llenyddiaeth (in Welsh). Abertawe: Coleg Prifysgol Abertawe. ISBN 978-0-86076-020-7.
- Roberts, Brynley F. (1991a). "Culhwch ac Olwen, The Triads, Saints' Lives". In Bromwich, Rachel; Jarman, A. O. H.; Roberts, Brynley F. (eds.). The Arthur of the Welsh. Cardiff: University of Wales Press. pp. 73–95. ISBN 978-0-7083-1107-3.
- Roberts, Brynley F. (1991b). "Geoffrey of Monmouth, Historia Regum Britanniae and Brut Y Brenhinedd". In Bromwich, Rachel; Jarman, A. O. H.; Roberts, Brynley F. (eds.). The Arthur of the Welsh. Cardiff: University of Wales Press. pp. 98–116. ISBN 978-0-7083-1107-3.
- Rosenberg, John D. (1973). The Fall of Camelot: A Study of Tennyson's 'Idylls of the King'. Cambridge, MA: Harvard University Press. ISBN 978-0-674-29175-1.
- Rodway, Simon (Summer 2005). "The date and authorship of Culhwch ac Olwen: a reassessment". Cambrian Medieval Celtic Studies (49): 21–44.
- Schama, Simon (2003). A History of Britain 1: 3000 BC-AD 1603 At the Edge of the World? (Paperback 2003 ed.). London: BBC Worldwide. ISBN 978-0-563-48714-2.
- Shippey, Tom (20 December 2018). "Review of King Arthur: the Making of the Legend by Nicholas Higham". London Review of Books. 40 (24): 23. ISSN 0260-9592.
- Simpson, Roger (1990). Camelot Regained: The Arthurian Revival and Tennyson, 1800–1849. Cambridge: Brewer. ISBN 978-0-85991-300-3.
- Sims-Williams, Patrick (1991). "The Early Welsh Arthurian Poems". In Bromwich, Rachel; Jarman, A. O. H.; Roberts, Brynley F. (eds.). The Arthur of the Welsh. Cardiff: University of Wales Press. pp. 33–71. ISBN 978-0-7083-1107-3.
- Smith, C.; Thompson, R. H. (1996). "Twain, Mark". In Lacy, Norris J. (ed.). The New Arthurian Encyclopedia. New York: Garland. p. 478. ISBN 978-1-56865-432-4.
- Staines, D. (1996). "Tennyson, Alfred Lord". In Lacy, Norris J. (ed.). The New Arthurian Encyclopedia. New York: Garland. pp. 446–449. ISBN 978-1-56865-432-4.
- Stokstad, M. (1996). "Modena Archivolt". In Lacy, Norris J. (ed.). The New Arthurian Encyclopedia. New York: Garland. pp. 324–326. ISBN 978-1-56865-432-4.
- Sweet, Rosemary (2004). Antiquaries: The Discovery of the Past in Eighteenth-century Britain. London, UK: Hambledon Continuum. ISBN 978-1852853099.
- Taylor, Beverly; Brewer, Elisabeth (1983). The Return of King Arthur: British and American Arthurian Literature Since 1800. Cambridge: Brewer. ISBN 978-0-389-20278-3.
- Thomas, Charles (1993). Book of Tintagel: Arthur and Archaeology. London: Batsford. ISBN 978-0-7134-6689-8.
- Thompson, R. H. (1996). "English, Arthurian Literature in (Modern)". In Lacy, Norris J. (ed.). The New Arthurian Encyclopedia. New York: Garland. pp. 136–144. ISBN 978-1-56865-432-4.
- Thorpe, Lewis, ed. (1966). Geoffrey of Monmouth, The History of the Kings of Britain. Harmondsworth: Penguin. OCLC 3370598.
- Tondro, Jason (2002). "Camelot in Comics". In Sklar, Elizabeth Sherr; Hoffman, Donald L. (eds.). King Arthur in Popular Culture. Jefferson, NC: McFarland. pp. 169–181. ISBN 978-0-7864-1257-0.
- Twain, Mark (1889). A Connecticut Yankee in King Arthur's Court. New York: Webster. OCLC 11267671.
- Ulrich von Zatzikhoven (2005) [c. 1194]. Lanzelet. Translated by Thomas Kerth. New York: Columbia University Press. ISBN 978-0-231-12869-8.
- Vinaver, Sir Eugène, ed. (1990). The Works of Sir Thomas Malory. Oxford: Oxford University Press. ISBN 978-0-19-812346-0. 3rd ed., revised.
- Watson, Derek (2002). "Wagner: Tristan und Isolde and Parsifal". In Barber, Richard (ed.). King Arthur in Music. Cambridge: D. S. Brewer. pp. 23–34. ISBN 978-0-85991-767-4.
- Walter, Philippe (2005) [2002]. Artù. L'orso e il re [Original French title: Arthur: l'ours et le roi; English: Arthur: The Bear and the King] (in Italian). Translated by M. Faccia. Edizioni Arkeios (Original French publisher: Imago).
- White, Terence Hanbury (1958). The Once and Future King. London: Collins. OCLC 547840.
- Winterbottom, Michael, ed. (1978). Gildas: The Ruin of Britain and Other Works (in Latin and English). London, UK: Philllimore. ISBN 978-0-85033-296-4.
- Wood, Charles T. (1991). "Fraud and Its Consequences: Savaric of Bath and the Reform of Glastonbury". In Abrams, Lesley; Carley, James P. (eds.). The Archaeology and History of Glastonbury Abbey: Essays in Honour of the Ninetieth Birthday of C.A. Ralegh Radford. Boydell & Brewer. pp. 273–283. ISBN 978-0851152844.
- Wordsworth, William (1835). "The Egyptian Maid, or, The Romance of the Water-Lily". The Camelot Project. The University of Rochester. Archived from the original on 5 July 2008.
- Workman, L. J. (1994). "Medievalism and Romanticism". Poetica (39–40): 1–44.
- Wright, Neil, ed. (1985). The Historia Regum Britanniae of Geoffrey of Monmouth, 1: Bern, Burgerbibliothek, MS. 568. Cambridge: Brewer. ISBN 978-0-85991-211-2.
- Zimmer, Stefan (2009). "The Name of Arthur – A New Etymology". Journal of Celtic Linguistics. 13 (1). University of Wales Press: 131–136.

Legendary titles
Preceded by Uther Pendragon	King of Britain	Succeeded by Constantine
