= Arthurian Narrative in the Latin Tradition =

1998 Monograph by Siân Echard

1998 book jacket

Arthurian Narrative in the Latin Tradition is monograph written by Siân Echard. With this book, her main intent is to examine stories about King Arthur's court written primarily in Latin, along with a few in English and Welsh versions. Arthurian scholars have largely ignored these texts because they usually focus on literature written in common, local languages. This book was originally published in print by Cambridge University Press in 1998. It was then published as an online E-book in 2010.

== Thesis ==
According to Michael Curley, reviewing the book for the academic journal Speculum, Echard's thesis says that Latin Arthurian stories should be understood primarily as products of the Latin writing tradition by the clerics in the courts of Henry I and Henry II (of England), rather than merely recorded as Arthurian legends.

== Reception ==
According to Curley, "When absorbed into scholarly conversation about Arthurian literature, Arthurian Narrative in the Latin Tradition will broaden considerably the basis of discussion of the topic and stimulate fruitful debate over whether, as Echard argues, Latin Arthurian texts possess a character uniquely their own, not to be found in their vernacular counterparts."
