= Gwrhyr Gwalstawd Ieithoedd =

Welsh mythological hero

Gwrhyr Gwalstawd Ieithoedd is a hero and shapeshifter of early Welsh literature and mythology and a warrior of King Arthur's court at Celliwig. He appears most prominently in the early Arthurian tale Culhwch and Olwen, in which he is handpicked among Arthur's knights to accompany Culhwch on his quest to win Olwen.

== Name ==
His name, Gwrhyr Gwalstawd Ieithoedd; "Gwrhyr, Interpreter of Languages", is notable because it includes "Gwalstawd" which is a loanword from the Old English word "wealhstod". The word was used by early Anglo-Saxons who used it for a person who could understand, interpret, or translate a Celtic or Romance language. The part "wealh" meant Welsh or Brythonic, but the element "stod" is of unknown meaning.

His first name "Gwrhyr" means prominent, or tall man, and "ieithoedd" is the Welsh word for languages.

== Role in Welsh tradition ==
After being cursed by his stepmother so that he marry no one but Olwen, daughter of the giant Ysbaddaden, Culhwch ap Cilydd seeks assistance from his cousin Arthur to win her hand in marriage. Arthur agrees to help him, sending six of his many warriors to assist him in his quest, with Gwrhyr as the fourth. Each warrior has his own unique skill; Gwrhyr described being able to speak every language, including those of the birds and the animals.

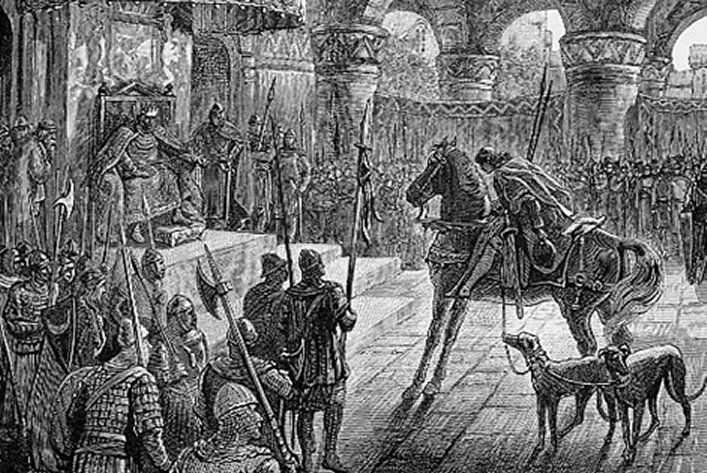
Culhwch entering Arthur's Court in the Welsh tale Culhwch and Olwen, 1881

He plays a conspicuous part in the tale; he is able to utilise his ability to converse with the oldest animals to free Mabon ap Modron from his imprisonment, and he is later sent as an emissary to the Twrch Trwyth whilst in the shape of a bird. The Dream of Rhonabwy names him as one of Arthur's chief councillors at the Battle of Badon, while the character also appears in the romance Geraint and Enid, in which he accompanies Geraint ab Erbin to Cornwall.

Gwrhyr is also mentioned in the late twelfth century Englynion y Clyweit, a collection of proverbial englyns attributed to various historical and mythological heroes. The text describes him as "perfect in all languages" and claims that he once sang the proverb "Who practices deceit will be deceived.
