= Glewlwyd Gafaelfawr =

Mythological figure

Glewlwyd Gafaelfawr ("Brave Grey Mighty Grasp") is a hero, warrior, and porter in tradition and Arthurian mythology, in which he appears as a knight in Arthur's retinue and chief gatekeeper of his court. He is one of the earliest characters to be associated with Arthur and appears in a number of texts, including Culhwch ac Olwen, Geraint fab Erbin, Iarlles y Ffynnon, Pa Gur yv y Porthur and the Welsh Triads.

== Role in Welsh tradition ==
=== Culhwch ac Olwen, and Pa Gur yv y Porthaur ===
After being cursed by his stepmother such that he may marry no one but Olwen, daughter of the giant Ysbaddaden, Culhwch ap Cilydd seeks assistance from his cousin Arthur to win her hand in marriage. He arrives at his court at Celliwig but is denied by the Glewlwyd, the chief porter. Culhwch threatens to wreak havoc unless he is granted entry to the court and, eventually, Glewlwyd relents. In a bombastic speech given in this tale, Glewlwyd recounts his history to Arthur, in which he claims to have been in different exotic locations across the world and Otherworld, often alongside Arthur:

:Two thirds of my life have gone by and two thirds of yours

I have been in Caer Se and Asse, in Sach and Salach,

In Lotor and Ffotor, in Greater India and Lesser India

And in the battle between the two Ynyrs when the twelve hostages were brought from Norway.

I have been in Europe and Africa, in the islands of Corsica,

In Caer Brythwch and Brythach and in Nerthach.

I was there when you overcame the troops of Gleis son of Merin, when you killed Mil the Black the son of Dugum.

I was there in the eastern part of the world when you conquered Greece,

in Caer Oeth and Anoeth, and in Caer Nefenhyr.

We have seen handsome noble-looking men but I have never seen a man like the one who now stands at the entrance of the gate.

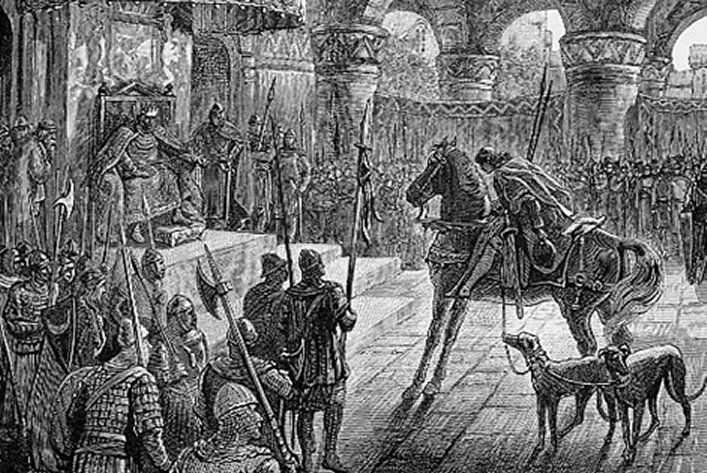
Culhwch entering Arthur's Court in the Welsh tale Culhwch and Olwen, 1881

This passage is closely related to the narrative of the tenth-century poem Pa Gur yv y Porthaur; "What man is the porter," in which Glewlwyd is the titular gatekeeper of a fortress to which Arthur and his men are seeking admittance. To prove their right of entry Arthur relates the feats and achievements of his men; particularly those of Cai and Bedwyr.

Later on in Culhwch ac Olwen, Glewlwyd leads his servants during the hunt for the man-turned-boar, Twrch Trwyth, and three of them, Huandaw, Gogigwr and Penpingion, are killed in the process, mortally wounded by the quarry. Glewlwyd is left with Llaesgymyn, "a man who was no use to anyone" as his sole remaining servant.

=== Other appearances ===
Glewlwyd is named twice in the Welsh Triads. He is listed as one of the twenty-four ordained knights of Arthur's court and is regarded as one of the "Three Offensive Knights of Arthur’s Court", alongside Sanddef and Morfran. They are known as the offensive knights because it is "repugnant to anyone to refuse them anything: Sanddef because of his beauty, Morfran because of his ugliness, and Glewlwyd because of his size and his strength and his ferocity." He is further named as the lover of Dyfyr Golden-Hair, one of the Three Famous Maidens of Arthur's Court.

In The Lady of the Fountain, the tale of the knight Owain, Glewlwyd is present at Arthur's court at Caerleon, once again in the role of gatekeeper, "greeting guests and foreigners, beginning to honour them, telling them the customs and habits of the court, and informing those who had the right to go to the hall or chamber or who merited lodging." In the romance of Geraint fab Erbin, Glewlwyd is once again chief gatekeeper at Caerleon, although it is stated "he did not trouble himself over this service except on one of the three important festivals." During the rest of the year, his duties are shared by his seven assistants: Gryn, Penpingion, Llaesgymyn, Gogyfwlch, Gwrddnei Cat-Eye, Drem ap Dremidydd and Clust fab Clusfeinydd.

Glewlwyd is further mentioned in satirical fifteenth or sixteenth parody, Araith Iolo Goch, in which a certain "amorous-mannered, grief-pallored, pale-cheeked youth" from Gwynedd seeks the heart of a maiden from Powys. In a conversation between the lady and her suitor, Glewlwyd's great strength is alluded to. Glewlwyd is described as "the man who lifted the cauldron down from the fire with one hand in the court of Toron of the three islands of Britain, with the sliced meat of seven oxen boiling in it". Whether or not this refers to a genuine tradition concerning Glewlwyd's exploits, or is merely an invention on the author's part, is unknown.
