= Menw =

Menw, son of Three-Cries (Middle Welsh: Menw fab Teirgwaedd), is a hero and shapeshifter in early Welsh literature, an "Enchanted Knight" of King Arthur at his court at Celliwig. He appears most prominently in the early Arthurian tale Culhwch and Olwen, in which he is handpicked among Arthur's warriors to accompany Culhwch on his quest to win Olwen. An "Enchanter Knight" of Arthur's court, he learned one of the Three Enchantments from Uther Pendragon. He is ascribed a son named Anynnawg.

== Role in Welsh tradition ==
After being cursed by his stepmother so that he marry no one but Olwen, daughter of the giant Ysbaddaden, Culhwch ap Cilydd seeks assistance from his cousin Arthur to win her hand in marriage. Arthur agrees to help him, sending six of his many warriors to assist him on his quest, with Menw as the sixth. Each warrior has his own unique skill; Menw is a skilled magician, able to place he and his companions under an illusion of invisibility so as to protect them in savage lands.

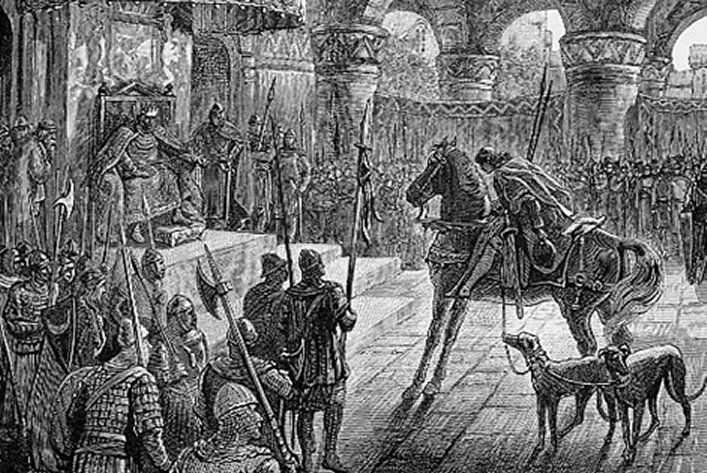
Culhwch entering Arthur's Court in the Welsh tale Culhwch and Olwen, 1881

Prior to the Hunting of Twrch Trwyth, Menw is sent in the form of a bird to spy on Twrch Trwyth and his piglets, eventually catching up with him at Osgair Oerfel in Ireland. Menw attempts to retrieve one of the boar's trinkets but is poisoned in the process and was thereafter never completely without injury. He also plays a part in the hunt proper, chasing the boar into the Severn alongside Mabon ap Modron and Goreu fab Custennin.

Later Menw appears in the tale Breuddwyd Rhonabwy as one of Arthur's chief councillors, and is also mentioned in a poem by fourteenth century bard Dafydd ap Gwilym:

Three warriors – it brings me riches –
knew well enchantments before this:
battle-experienced, the first upholds his name –
the gentlest of the three was Menw
the second's name (good day for understanding):
is Eiddilig the Dwarf, a wily Irishman
third was, beside the seas of Mon,
Math, lord of splendid kind, and
Arfon's king.

== Bibliography ==
- MacKillop, James (2004). "Menw fab Teirgwaedd". In A Dictionary of Celtic Mythology. Oxford: Oxford University Press.
