= Amlawdd Wledig =

Legendary king of sub-Roman Britain

- Spouses: Dwywn; Gwenwyn (Gwen ferch Cunedda); Eglise; Scotnoe; Denyw
- Issue (among others): Eigyr (f); Rieingulid (f); Goleuddydd (f); Danhadlwen (f); Tywanwedd (f); Natlod or Natanleod (possibly son-in-law); King Gwrfoddw or Gwrfoddw Hen (disputed)
- Father: Kynwal or Lambor(d) (disputed)

Amlawdd Wledig (Middle Welsh and other alternative spellings present in relevant sources include Amlawd, Amlawt, Anlawdd, Anlawd, Amlodd, Amlwyd, Aflawdd and Anblaud) was a legendary king of sub-Roman Britain. The Welsh title [G]wledig, archaically Gwledic or Guletic and Latinised Guleticus, is defined as follows: "lord, king, prince, ruler; term applied to a number of early British rulers and princes who were prominent in the defence of Britain about the time of the Roman withdrawal; (possibly) commander of the native militia (in a Romano-British province)".

== Location ==
He is described as a king of 'some part of Wales, possibly on the border with Herefordshire. If it is accepted that King Gwrfoddw of Ergyng (see below under children) is Amlawdd's son, there would be a logic to Amlawdd also having been a king in the Ergyng or Herefordshire area.

== Family ==
=== Ancestry ===
At least three different genealogies are suggested for Amlawdd Wledig:

- The Bonedd yr Arwyr (Section 31) names Amlawdd as the son of Kynwal, son of Ffrewdwr, son of Gwarvawr/Gwdion, son of Kadif[en]/Kadien (Gadeon), son of Cynan, son of Eudaf, son of Caradoc, son of Brân, son of Llŷr.
- Peter Bartrum notes that a different genealogy for Amlawdd is present in Peniarth MS 178, part 1, p. 1 (by Gruffudd Hiraethog, c. 1545). There, Amlawdd's daughter is named as Eigr ferch ('daughter of') Aflawdd Wledig ap Lambor (or Lambord) ap Manael ap Carcelois ap Jossue ap Evgen chwaer ('sister of') Joseph a Armathia. Bartrum explains (p. 130) that around the year 1400 the monks of Glastonbury adapted the lineage of the Vulgate Quest's Grail Kings to descend from Enigeus (sister of Joseph of Arimathea) down to Lambor, father of the Maimed King, who in this account fathers an unnamed son who is in turn the father of Arthur's mother Eigr or Ygerne. Bartrum points out that later Welsh texts adapted this genealogy, replacing the word filius (‘son’), which stood for the unnamed son, with Amlawdd Wledig.
- It has also been suggested that the name Amlawdd could be a variation of the name Amleth or Amlethus, which appears in Saxo Grammaticus' thirteenth century Gesta Danorum and is the origin of Shakespeare's character Hamlet. However, Amleth is described as a Jute (rather than a Dane) who marries the daughter of the British King on his first trip to Britain. In terms of the chronology, Amleth could be identical to Amlawdd Wledig. However, Amlawdd is not described as being of Jutish or Saxon origin in the Welsh Arthurian texts.

=== Wives ===
Amlawdd is said to have been the husband of Gwen, the daughter of Cunedda Wledig, the legendary northern king said either to have migrated or to have been sent south by Vortigern to drive Irish invaders from the Kingdom of Gwynedd.

=== Children ===
A number of figures from the Arthurian legends are suggested (with varying levels of plausibility) to have been the children of Amlawdd, including:

- Eigyr, Igraine, Ygerne the mother of King Arthur.
- Rieingulid, the mother of St Illtud.
- Goleuddydd, the mother of Culhwch.
- Tywanwedd, Tywynwedd or Dwywanedd, the wife of Hawystl Gloff and the mother of Caradawc Vreichvras, Gwyn ab Nudd, Gwallawc ab Lleenawg, and Tyfrydog or Tyvrydog. (Source: Bonedd y Saint) Tyfrydog was a saint who flourished in the sixth century.
- Two unnamed daughters, sisters to Enfeidas (f), by Amlawdd's fifth wife Denyw (see Wives, above). Enfeidas is said, in Heinrich von dem Türlin's Diu Crône to be Arthur's aunt, a goddess, and the queen of Avalon.
- Gwyar, argued by some to be the mother of Gwalchmai or Gawain; however, others argue that Gwyar is a male name and that Gwyar is therefore the name of Gwalchmai's father. Gwyar is also said to be the wife of Geraint and the mother of Cadwy (Cador)
- Llygadrudd Emys ('Red-Eye Stallion') and Gwrbothu Hen ('Gwrfoddw the Old'), listed as brothers of Arthur's unnamed mother in Culhwch and Olwen, killed by Twrch Trwyth at Ystrad Yw. Gwrbothu Hen may refer to the later historical King Gwrfoddw of Ergyng, or an ancestor of his as denoted by the epithet Hen ('the old' or 'the elder').
- Gweir Paladr Hir ('Gwair Long Staff') and Gweir Gwrhyd Ennwir ('Gwair False Valour'), listed as "uncles of Arthur, his mother's brothers" later in the Arthurian court lists of Culhwch and Olwen.

== Relationship to King Arthur and debated historicity ==
Amlawdd Wledig is named in many sources to have been the maternal grandfather of King Arthur, while others suggest he is a genealogical construct, created in order to justify the kinship connections referred to in the Welsh prose tale of Culhwch and Olwen between Arthur, Culhwch, St Illtud and Goreu fab Custennin. Amlawdd does not appear in the list of Kings of Britain given by Geoffrey of Monmouth.
