= Bedivere =

Legendary Arthurian knight

- Matter of Britain character
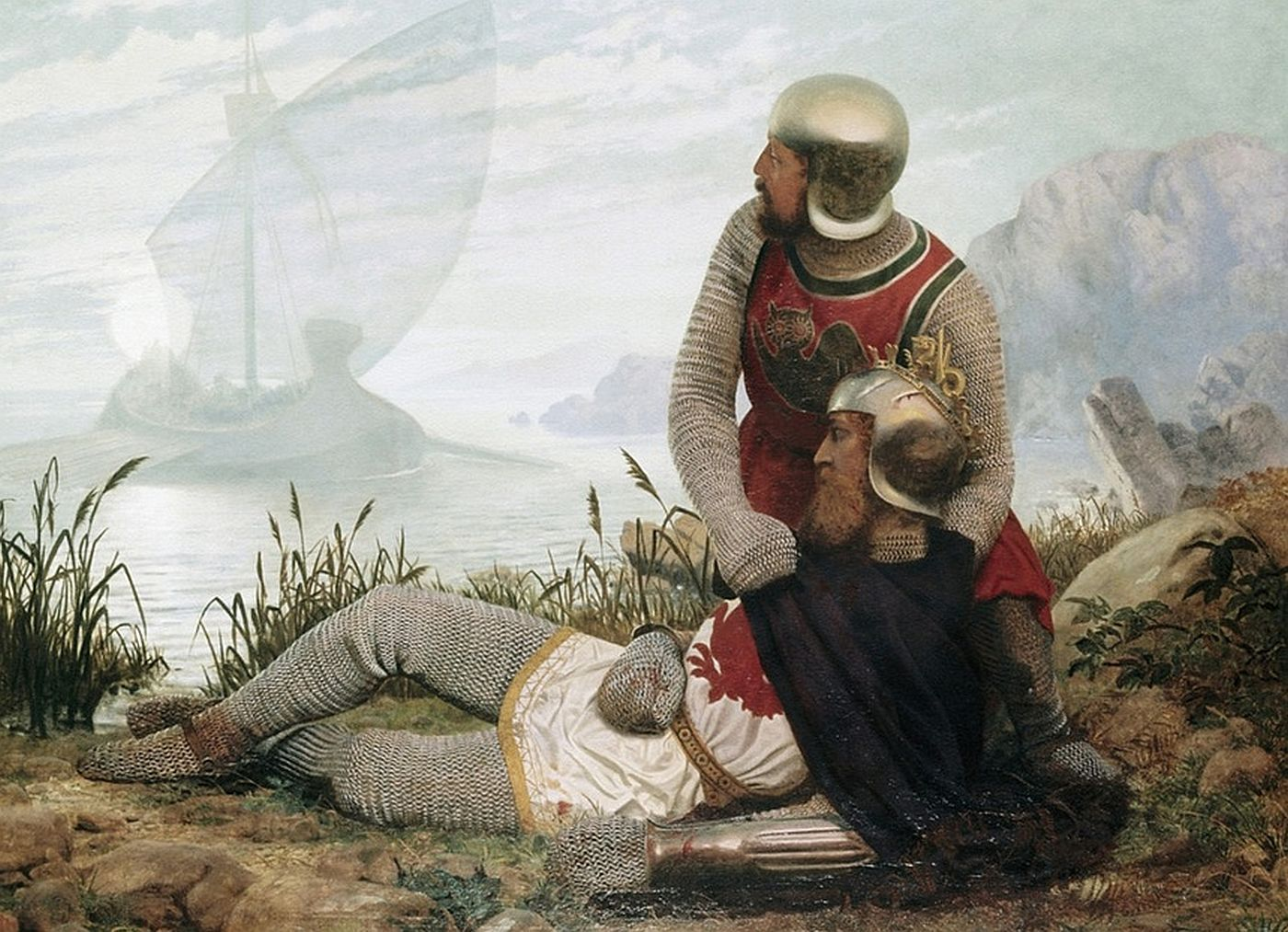
- Bedivere waits with Arthur for the barge of the three queens in John Mulcaster Carrick's The Death of King Arthur (1862)
- First appearance: Historia Regum Britanniae
- Based on: Bedwyr Bedrydant

In-universe information
- Title: Sir
- Occupation: Knight of the Round Table
- Family: Lucan, Griflet

Bedivere (/ˈbɛdɪvɪər/ or /ˈbiːdɪvɪər/; Welsh: Bedwyr; Latin: Beduerus; French: Bédoier, also Bedevere and other spellings) is one of the earliest characters to be featured in the legend of King Arthur, originally described in several Welsh texts as the one-handed great warrior named Bedwyr Bedrydant. Arthurian chivalric romances, inspired by his portrayal in the chronicle Historia Regum Britanniae, portray Bedivere as a Knight of the Round Table of King Arthur who serves as Arthur's marshal and is frequently associated with his brother Lucan and his cousin Griflet as well as with Kay. In the English versions, Bedivere notably assumes Griflet's hitherto traditional role from French romances as the one who eventually returns Excalibur to the Lady of the Lake after Arthur's last battle.

== Legend ==
=== Bedwyr ===
In early Welsh sources, Bedwyr Bedrydant ("Bedwyr of the Perfect Sinew") is a handsome, one-handed warrior under Arthur's command. His father is given as Pedrawd or Bedrawd, and his children as Amhren and Eneuawg, both members of Arthur's court.

One of the earliest direct references to Bedwyr can be found in the 10th-century poem Pa gur which recounts the exploits of a number of Arthur's men, including Bedwyr, Cei (Kay) and Manawydan. Of Bedwyr, this narration says:

They fell by the hundred / before Bedwyr of the Perfect-Sinew.
On the shores of Tryfrwyd / fighting with Garwlwyd / furious was his nature / with sword and shield.

The 9th-century version of Englynion y Beddau ("The Stanzas of the Graves") gives Bedwyr's final resting place on Tryfan. In the hagiography of Cadoc, Bedwyr is alongside Arthur and Cei in dealing with King Gwynllyw of Gwynllwg's abduction of Gwladys from her father's court in Brycheiniog. A possible allusion to Bedwyr could be found in the reference to Bedwyr's well in the 9th-century Marwnad Cadwallon ap Cadfan. The Welsh Triads name Bedwyr as "Battle-Diademed", and a superior to Drystan (Tristan), Hueil mab Caw and even Cei. A catchphrase often quipped by Cei, "by the hand of my friend" is possibly a reference to Bedwyr's disability.

Bedwyr is a prominent character in the tale of Culhwch and Olwen, in which he appears at the head of Arthur's court list with his friend Cei and is described as one of the most handsome men in the world (save for Arthur and Drych fab Cibddar), and is the wielder of a magical spear with the ability to separate the tip of the shaft to attack and that all the wounds caused by the spear were equal to nine wounds. He is called upon to accompany Culhwch on his quest to win Olwen's hand in marriage and is the first to strike the giant Ysbaddaden with the poisoned spear meant for Culhwch. Bedwyr goes on to assist Culhwch in completing the impossible tasks given to him by Ysbaddaden; he helps Cei and Goreu fab Custennin kill Wrnach the Giant, rescues Mabon ap Modron from his imprisonment, retrieves the hairs of Dillus the Bearded, captures the Cauldron of Diwrnach during Arthur's raid on Ireland, and takes part in the hunting of the monstrous boar Twrch Trwyth with Arthur's dog Cavall at his side. The tale ends with the completion of the tasks, the humiliation and death of Ysbaddaden, and the marriage of Culhwch and Olwen.

=== Bedivere ===
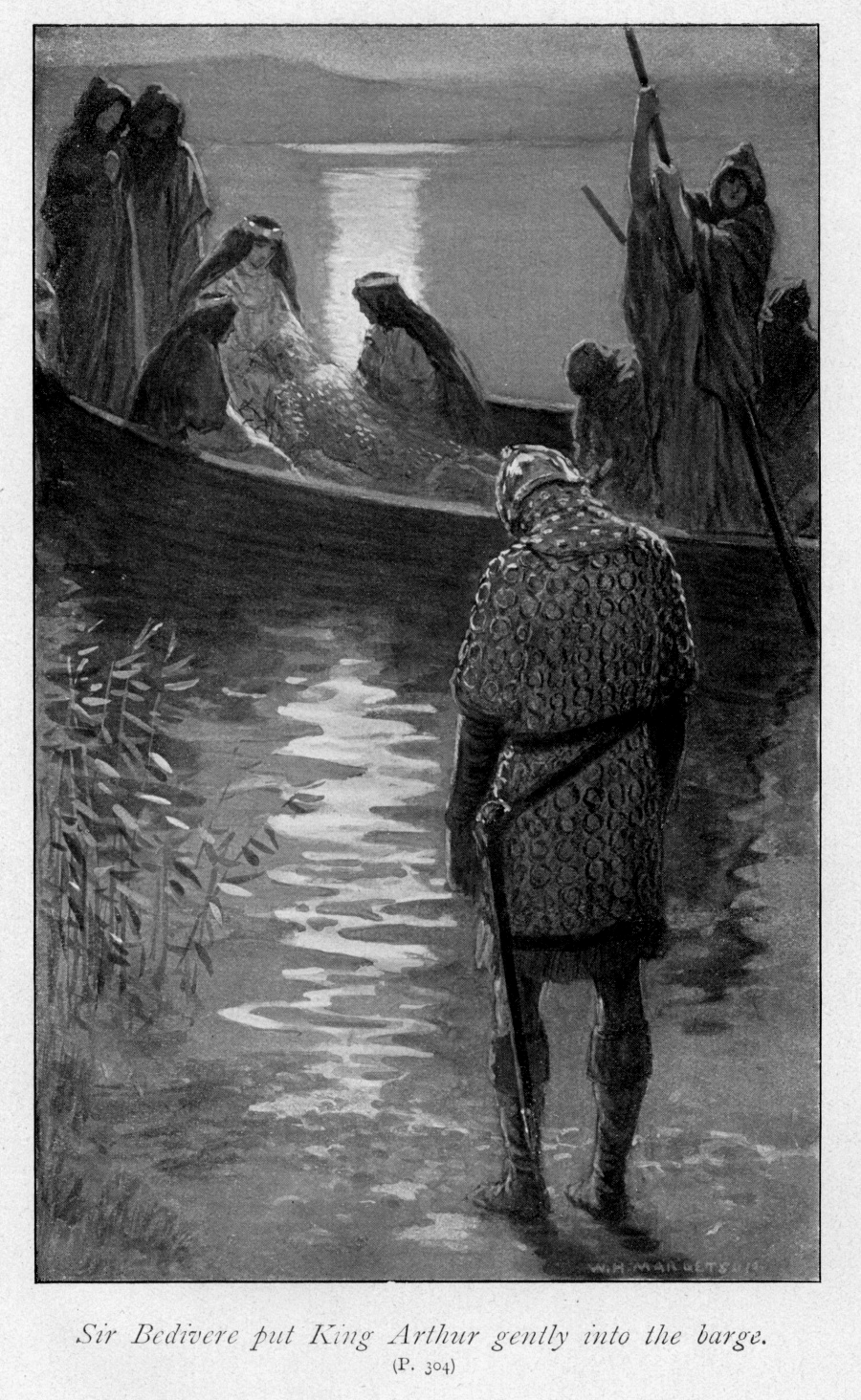
William Henry Margetson's illustration for Legends of King Arthur and His Knights (1914), adapted from Malory by Janet Macdonald: "Sir Bedivere put King Arthur gently into the barge."

Bedivere is one of Arthur's loyal allies in Geoffrey of Monmouth's Historia Regum Britanniae (appearing there as Beduerus) and its adaptations (for example, as Beduer in Layamon's Brut), and maintains this position in much later Arthurian literature. He is Arthur's royal butler and is rewarded the province of Estrusia (Normandy) after the British conquest of the Roman Gaul. (In the Icelandic version, Breta sögur, this is changed to "[Arthur] gave his daughter Beduerus to his cup bearer Estrusia".) He helps Arthur and Kay fight the Giant of Mont Saint-Michel, and joins Arthur in his war against Emperor Lucius of Rome, in which he dies fighting. In the English Alliterative Morte Arthure, he and Kay are mortally wounded while heroically fighting against the Romans in the Battle of Sessye.

In Thomas Malory's Le Morte d'Arthur, 'Bedwyr' (as he is initially known) plays a similar role against the Giant, and is seriously wounded in a battle in an episode taken probably from the Vulgate Suite, before disappearing from the text to return rather ingloriously as Sir Bedivere to accompany Arthur at his end. In the original French romances, this final role belonged to a cousin of Bedevere (Bedoier), Griflet.

In Malory's version and the Stanzaic Morte Arthur, Bedivere and Arthur are among the few survivors of the Battle of Camlann (or of Salisbury). After the battle, at the request of the mortally wounded king, Bedivere casts away the sword Excalibur that Arthur had received from the Lady of the Lake. However, he does this only after twice thinking the sword too valuable to Britain to throw into the water. When he reports that nothing in particular happened, King Arthur admonishes him, for Arthur knows that the mystical sword would create some supernatural event. Finally, Bedivere casts the sword into the water, at which a hand arises and catches the sword mid-air, then sinks into the waters, and Arthur is thus assured that the sword has been returned. In Malory's telling, this act summons Morgan and Nimue, who take the king to Avalon. Upon the presumed death of Arthur, Bedivere enters a hermitage led by the Mordred-ousted Archbishop of Canterbury, where he spends the remainder of his life. There he will be joined by Lancelot and some of his kindred knights, who will resort to it in their own penitence.

== Modern culture ==
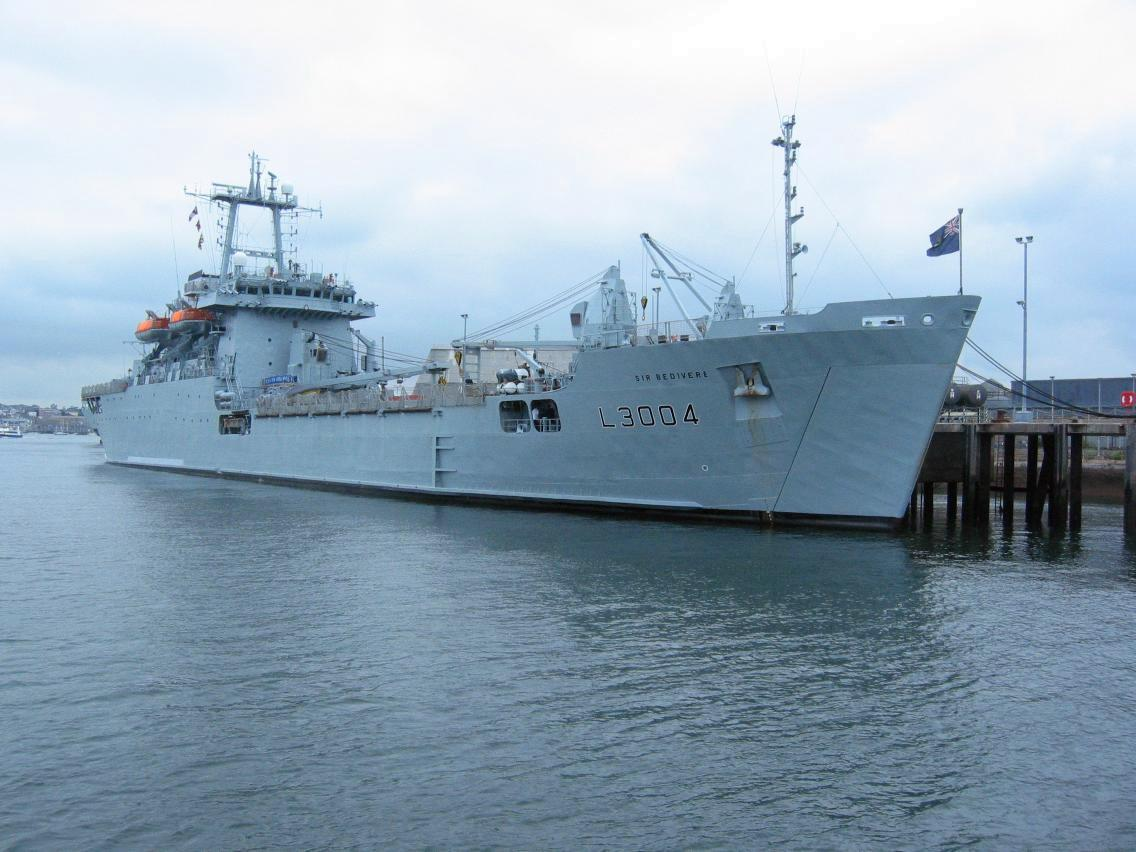
British auxiliary naval vessel RFA Sir Bedivere (2006)

=== Literature ===
Some modern Arthurian authors, such as Rosemary Sutcliff in Sword at Sunset (1963), Mary Stewart in The Merlin Trilogy (1970-1979), Gillian Bradshaw in Hawk of May (1980) and In Winter's Shadow (1991), Joan Wolf in The Road to Avalon (1998), and Philip Reeve in Here Lies Arthur (2007) transfer Lancelot's traditional role as Guinevere's lover to Bedwyr/Bedivere, Lancelot's character having been introduced to the legend too late to seem historical. A similar motif appears in Maureen Peters' Sangreal (1984), set in 1790, where Bedwin is a lover of Gwendolen, wife of Rex Britain.

Bedivere is also a major character in many other works of modern literature, including John Reade's poem "The Prophecy of Merlin" (1870), John Masefield's play Tristan and Isolt: A Play in Verse (1927), Alan Lupack's poem "Bedivere Contemplates Camelot" (in The Dream of Camelot, 1986), David Gareth's short story "Sir Mador Seeks the Grail" (in King Arthur and his Knights, 1987), Persia Woolley's novel Child of the Northern Spring (1995), A. A. Attanasio's novel The Serpent and the Grail (1995), and Ed Greenwood's short story "The Shadow of a Sword" (in The Doom of Camelot, 2000). As Bedwyr, he has major roles in Roy Turner's novel King of the Lordless Country (1971), and in Patricia Kennealy-Morrison's novels The Throne of Scone (1986) and The Hawk's Gray Feather (1990).

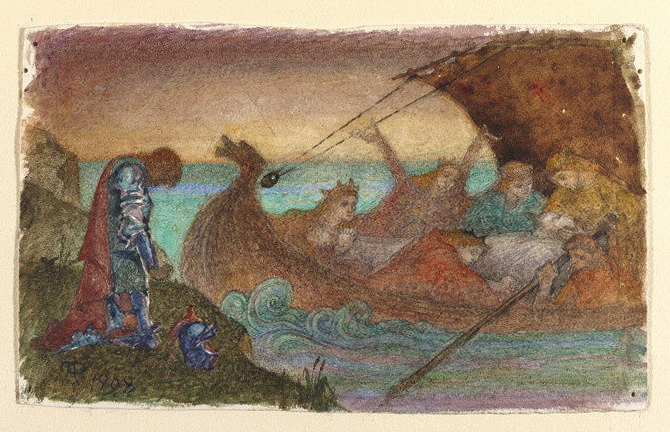
Phoebe Anna Traquair, The Passing of Arthur (1908)

- In Tennyson's Arthurian poetry, Bedivere is the first and the last of Arthur's knights. The final poem in the cycle Idylls of the King, "The Passing of Arthur", is told from his point of view.
- Bedwyr is the narrator of George Finkel's 1967 novel Twilight Province (aka Watch Fires to the North).
- Alan Brownjohn's 1972 poem "Calypso for Sir Bedivere" retells the story of Excalibur, suggesting that it was a lie told first by Arthur and then in turn by Bedivere.
- A dying Bedivere narrates the story of Arthur in Catherine Christian's 1978 novel The Sword and the Flame (aka The Pendragon).
- Bedivere is an alternating co-protagonist of Robert Rice's 1991 novel The Last Pendragon, beginning with him having hid Excalibur instead of throwing it away.
- Bedivere is the main character in Tom Holt's 1994 novel Grailblazers.
- In Steve White's 1995 novel Debt of Ages, Bedivere is the identity assumed by the time-travelling protagonist Sarnac.
- Although he plays a minor part in Bernard Cornwell's series The Warlord Chronicles, many of his legendary deeds (such as throwing Excalibur into the lake—or, in Cornwell's story, the sea) are carried out instead by the series' protagonist and narrator, Derfel Cadarn. He, alike Bedwyr of the legend, also eventually also loses one of his hands, fighting one-armed during the final act of Excalibur: A Novel of Arthur (1997).
- Esther Friesner's short story "Sparrow" (collected in Return to Avalon, 1996) has Bedivere as a villain who secretly stole Excalibur after the Battle of Camlann. Bedivere at Camlann is also a major character in Friesner's farce "Totally Camelot" published in Asimov's Science Fiction in 1998.
- Bedivere is the narrator in Catherine Wells' short story "The Hermit's Tale" (collected in The Doom of Camelot, 2000), retelling the life and death of Arthur in a more realistic manner.
- Patrick McCormack's 2000 novel Albion: The White Phantom tells of Bedwyr's search for Gwenhwyvar (Guinevere) after the death of Arthur.
- He appears as Bedwyr in Philip Reeve's 2007 novel Here Lies Arthur, as a friend of the main character Gwyn and Arthur's half-sister's younger son, the elder being Medrawt (Mordred). He is murdered by Arthur, for betrayal with Arthur's wife, Gwenhwyfar (Guinevere), in a similar role to the later Lancelot. This causes a family rift with Medrawt, who takes revenge by raising an army against Arthur, killing him, and taking his city of Aquae Sulis for himself.
- Bedivere features as one of the main characters of Lev Grossman's 2024 novel The Bright Sword, where he is Arthur's closest companion and secretly in love with Arthur.

=== Other media ===
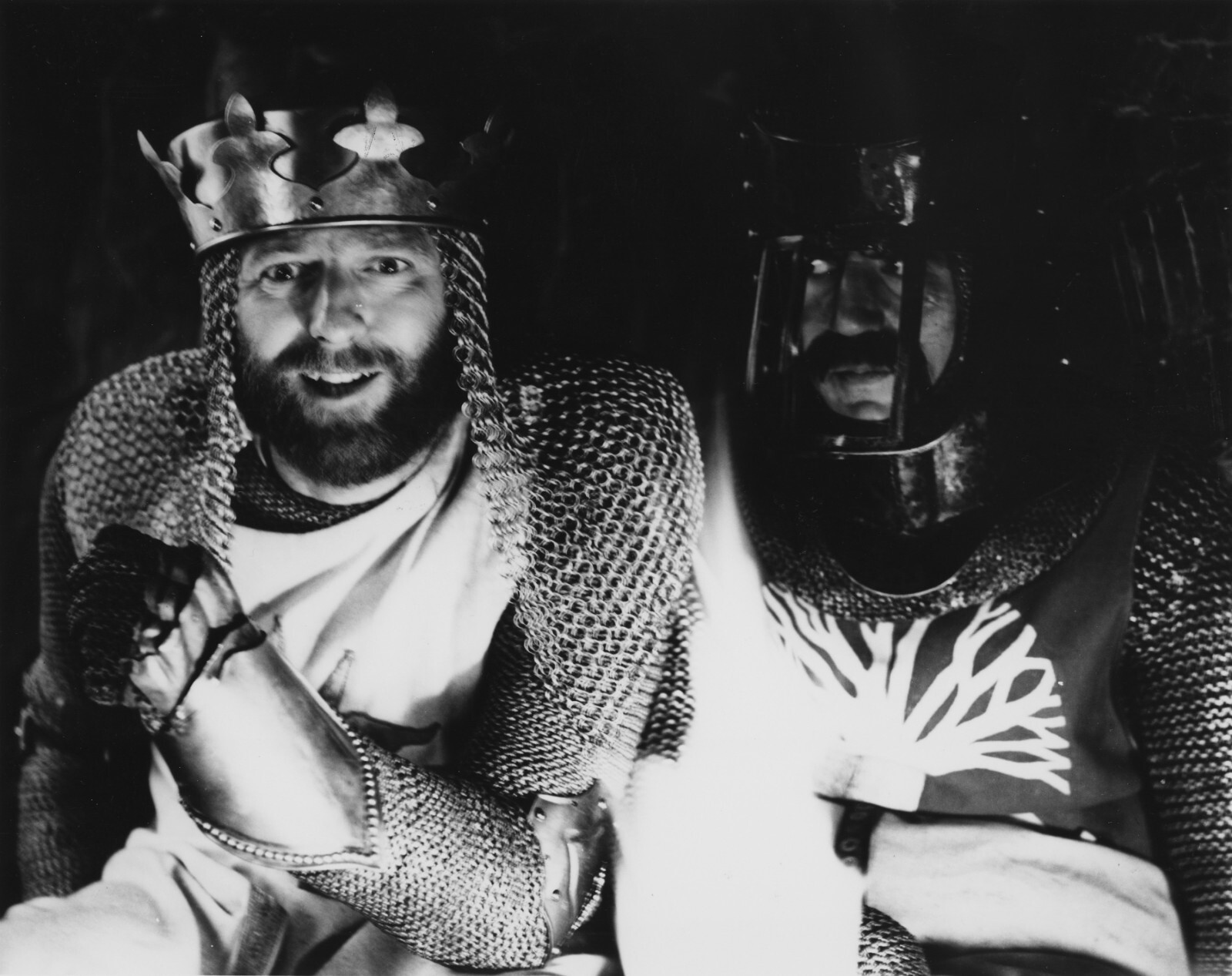
Graham Chapman and Terry Jones as King Arthur and Sir Bedevere in a publicity photo of the 1975 film Monty Python and the Holy Grail

- In the 1975 comedy film Monty Python and the Holy Grail, the ironically-named Sir Bedevere the Wise (played by Terry Jones) is regarded as brilliant man of science by other characters, but his methods revolve around absurd theories such as the Earth being banana-shaped and witches burning and floating on water because they are made of wood. In one scene, he devises a Trojan Horse styled scheme with a big wooden rabbit to get inside a French castle, but overlooks the crucial detail of Arthur and the knights actually being inside it.
- In John Boorman's 1981 film Excalibur, he is replaced by the composite character of Percival as the knight who returns the sword to the Lady of the Lake.
- Bedivere has a cameo in the 2008-2012 television series Merlin in the episode "Le Morte d'Arthur" in which he is killed by the Questing Beast.
- Bedivere appears in the video game and visual novel Fate/stay night in an epilogue, during the game's version of Artoria's death. He also appears in the mobile game Fate/Grand Order as a character summonable by the protagonist, notably from a version of the Arthurian tale where he fails in delivering Excalibur to the Lady of the Lake, inadvertently stopping King Arthur from going to Avalon. In the anime adaptation by Studio Deen, the character is voiced by Mamiko Noto, a female voice actress and is thus interpreted by some to be female.
- Bedivere is female in the webcomic series Arthur, King of Time and Space.
- He is the final boss of the Avalonian Dungeon in the video game Albion Online as Lord Bedivere.
- In Guy Ritchie's 2017 film King Arthur: Legend of the Sword, Djimon Hounsou plays Sir Bedivere, the leader of the anti-Vortigern resistance and a former knight of Uther.
- Derfel Cadarn was portrayed by Iain De Caestecker in a limited role (neither narrator nor actual protagonist) in the 2023 television series The Winter King, a loose adaptation of early parts of Cornwell's book series' first entry by the same title.
