= Kay (Arthurian legend) =

Legendary Arthurian knight

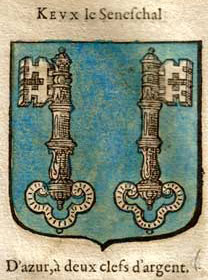
"Keux's" attributed arms

In the Arthurian legend, Kay /ˈkeɪ/ (Welsh: Cai, Middle Welsh Kei or Cei; Latin: Caius; French: Keu; Old French: Kès or Kex) is King Arthur's foster brother and later seneschal, as well as one of the first Knights of the Round Table. In later literature he is known for his acid tongue and bullying, boorish behaviour, but in earlier accounts he was one of Arthur's premier warriors. Along with Bedivere, with whom he is frequently associated, Kay is one of the earliest characters associated with Arthur. Kay's father is called Ector in later literature, but the Welsh accounts name him as Cynyr Ceinfarfog.

== Cai in Welsh tradition ==
Cai or Cei is one of the earliest characters to be associated with the Arthurian mythology, appearing in a number of early Welsh texts, including Culhwch ac Olwen, Geraint fab Erbin, Iarlles y Ffynnon, Peredur fab Efrawg, Breuddwyd Rhonabwy, Pa Gur, and the Welsh Triads. His father is given as Cynyr Ceinfarfog (Fork-Beard), his son as Garanwyn and his daughter as Kelemon.

Before Cai's birth, Cynyr prophesied that his son's heart would be eternally cold, that he would be exceptionally stubborn, and that no one would be able to brave fire or water like him. Cai is attributed with a number of further superhuman abilities, including the ability to go nine days and nine nights without the need to breathe or to sleep, the ability to grow as "tall as the tallest tree in the forest if he pleased" and the ability to radiate supernatural heat from his hands. Furthermore, it is impossible to cure a wound from Cai's sword. Cai is killed by Gwyddawg fab (son of) Menestyr, who is in turn killed in vengeance by Arthur.

Robert Graves commented that the early description of Cei "is close to the account given of the Sun-hero Cuchulain in his battle rage. But in the later Arthurian legends Cei has degenerated into a buffoon and Chief of Cooks"—an aspect of the folklore process whereby old heroes must be downgraded (but not forgotten) in order to make room for new.

=== Pa Gur yv y Porthaur ===
One of the earliest direct reference to Cai can be found in the 13th-century poem Pa Gur, in which Arthur recounts the feats and achievements of his warriors so as to gain entrance to a fortress guarded by Glewlwyd Gafaelfawr, the titular porter. The poem concerns itself largely with Cai's exploits:

Prince of the plunder, / The unrelenting warrior to his enemy; / Heavy was he in his vengeance; / Terrible was his fighting.
When he would drink from a horn, / He would drink as much as four; / When into battle he came / He slew as would a hundred.
Unless God should accomplish it, / Cei's death would be unattainable.
Worthy Cei and Llachau / Used to fight battles, / Before the pain of livid spears [ended the conflict].
On the top of Ystarfingun / Cei slew nine witches. / Worthy Cei went to Ynys Mon / To destroy lions. / Little protection did his shield offer / Against Palug's Cat.

=== Culhwch ac Olwen ===
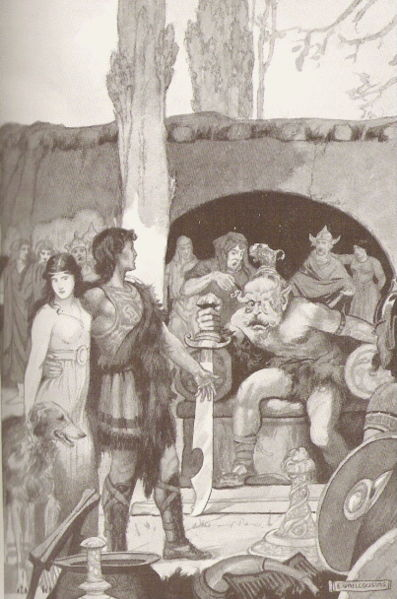
Culhwch and his companions at Ysbadadden's court in Ernest Wallcousins’ illustration for Celtic Myth & Legend (1920)

In the story, Cai is the first knight to volunteer to assist Culhwch in his quest, promising to stand by his side until Olwen is found. A further five knights join them in their mission. They travel onwards until they come across the "fairest of the castles of the world", and meet Ysbaddaden's shepherd brother, Custennin. They learn that the castle belongs to Ysbaddaden, that he stripped Custennin of his lands and murdered the shepherd's twenty-three children out of cruelty. Custennin set up a meeting between Culhwch and Olwen, and the maiden agrees to lead Culhwch and his companions to Ysbadadden's castle. Cai pledges to protect the twenty-fourth son, Goreu, with his life. The knights attack the castle by stealth, killing the nine porters and the nine watchdogs, and enter the giant's hall. Eventually, Ysbaddaden agrees to give Culhwch his daughter on the condition that he completes a number of impossible tasks (anoethau), including hunting the Twrch Trwyth and recovering the exalted prisoner Mabon ap Modron.

Cai is a prominent character throughout the tale and is responsible for completing a number of the tasks; he kills Wrnach the Giant, rescues Mabon from his watery prison and retrieves the hairs of Dillus the Bearded. However, when Arthur makes a satirical englyn about Cai, he grows angry and hostile towards the king, ultimately abandoning the quest and his companions. The narrative tells us that Cai would "have nothing to do with Arthur from then on, not when the latter was waning in strength or when his men were being killed." As a result, he did not take part in the hunt for Twrch Trwyth.

=== Other appearances ===
In the Life of St. Cadoc (c. 1100) Bedwyr is alongside Arthur and Cai in dealing with King Gwynllyw of Gwynllwg's abduction of St. Gwladys from her father's court in Brycheiniog. Cai appears prominently in the early Welsh version of Tristan and Isolde, in which he assists the two lovers and is himself infatuated with a maiden named Golwg Hafddydd, and in the early dialogue poems relating to Melwas's abduction of Gwenhwyfar. The context suggests that Cai is rescuing the queen from the otherworldly suitor, and may imply a romantic relationship between Cai and Gwenhwyfar.

The Welsh Triads name Cai as one of the "Three Battle-Diademed Men of the Island of Britain" alongside Drystan mab Tallwch and Hueil mab Caw. In the Triads of the Horses, his horse is named as Gwyneu gwddf hir (Gwyneu of the Long Neck). According to tradition, Cai is intimately associated with the old Roman fort of Caer Gai.

In the Welsh Romances (specifically Owain, or the Lady of the Fountain and Peredur son of Efrawg), Cai assumes the same boorish role he takes in the continental romances. However, manuscripts for these romances date to well after Chrétien de Troyes, meaning that Cai as he appears there may owe more to Chrétien's version of the character than to the indigenous Welsh representation.

== Kay in chronicles and romances ==
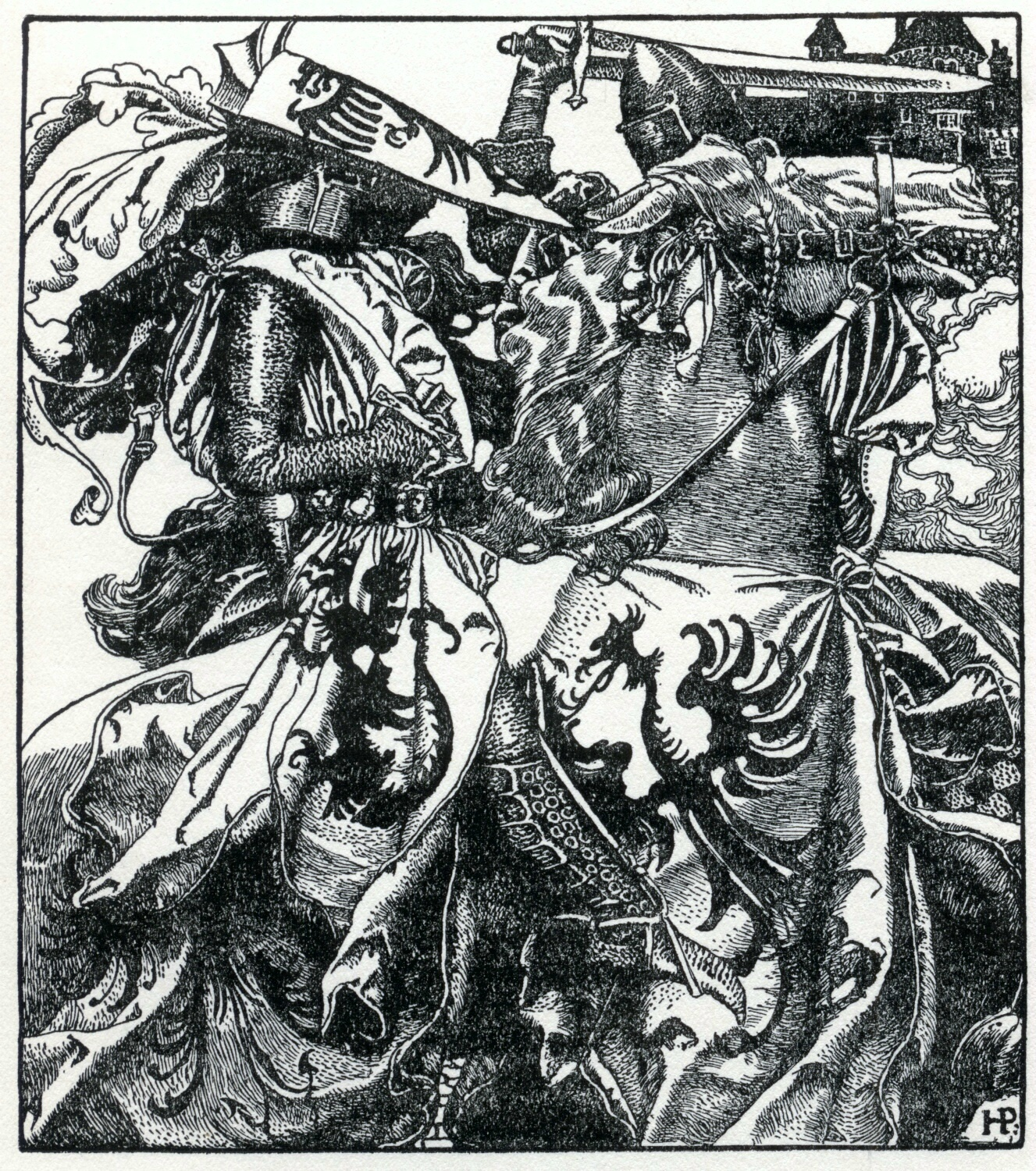
"Sir Kay breaketh his sword at ye Tournament" from The Story of King Arthur and His Knights by Howard Pyle (1903)

Kay and Bedivere both appear in Geoffrey of Monmouth's Historia Regum Britanniae, and support Arthur in his defeat of the Giant of Mont Saint-Michel. Geoffrey makes Kay the count of Anjou and Arthur's steward, an office which he holds in most later literature. In Chrétien de Troyes's Erec and Enide, a son Gronosis is mentioned, who is versed in evil. By contrast, the Welsh attribute to him a son and daughter named Garanwyn and Celemon. Romance literature rarely deals with Kay's love life, with one exception being Girart d'Amiens's Escanor, which details his love for Andrivete of Northumbria, whom he must defend from her uncle's political machinations before they can marry.

In the works of Chrétien, Kay assumes the characteristics with which he is most associated today: hot-headedness and fiery temper (retained from the Welsh literature), supplemented by his role as an incompetent braggart. Chrétien uses him as a scoffer and a troublemaker; a foil for heroic knights such as Lancelot, Yvain, and Gawain. He mocks the chivalric courtesy of Calogrenant in Yvain, the Knight of the Lion, and he tricks Arthur into allowing him to try to save Guinevere from Maleagant in Lancelot, the Knight of the Cart, which ends in his humiliating defeat. In Perceval, the Story of the Grail, Sir Kay grows angry with Perceval's naïveté and slaps a maiden who says he will become a great knight; Perceval later avenges her by breaking Kay's shoulder. Wolfram von Eschenbach, who tells a similar story in his Parzival, asks his audience not to judge Kay too harshly, as his sharp words actually serve to maintain courtly order: "Though few may agree with me—Keie was a brave and loyal man ... The mighty Keie."

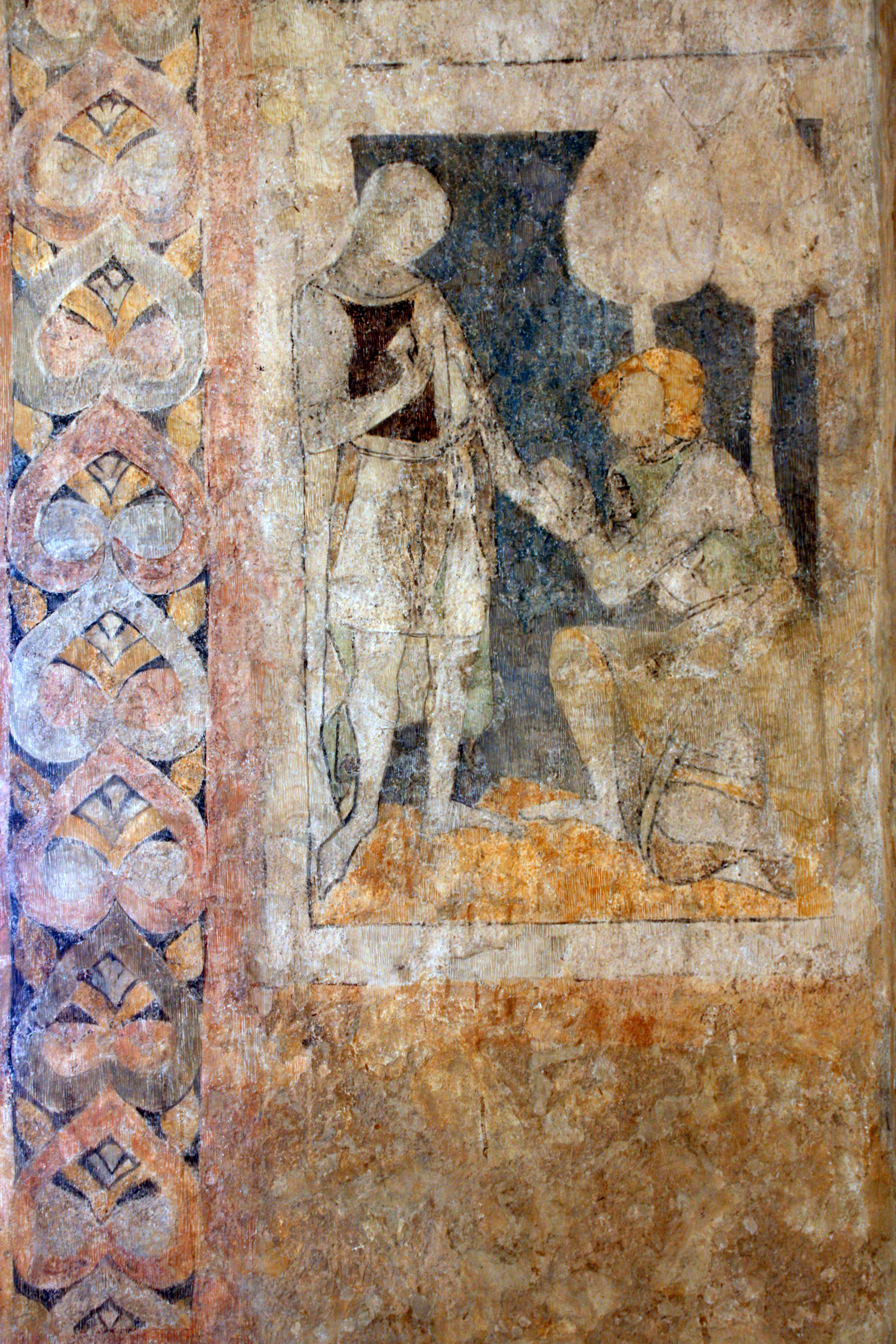
Kay and Lancelot in a 14th-century fresco at Siedlęcin Tower

Kay is ubiquitous in Arthurian literature but he rarely serves as anything but a foil for other characters. Although he manipulates the king to get his way, his loyalty to Arthur is usually unquestioned. In the Vulgate Cycle, the Post-Vulgate, and Thomas Malory's Le Morte d'Arthur, Kay's father Ector adopts the infant Arthur after Merlin takes him away from his birth parents, Uther and Igraine. Ector raises the future king and Kay as brothers, but Arthur's parentage is revealed when he draws the Sword in the Stone at a tournament in London. Arthur, serving as squire to the newly knighted Kay, is locked out of the house and cannot get to his brother's sword, so he uses the Sword in the Stone to replace it. Kay shows his characteristic opportunism when he tries to claim it was in fact he that pulled the sword from the stone, not Arthur, making Kay the true King of the Britons, but he ultimately relents and admits it was Arthur. He becomes one of the first Knights of the Round Table, described as "best worthy to be a knight of the Round Table of any", and serves his foster-brother throughout his life.

Scholars have pointed out that Kay's scornful, overly boastful character never makes him a coward or a traitor, except in the Grail romance Perlesvaus, in which he murders Arthur's son Loholt and joins up with the king's enemies. This strange work is an anomaly, however, and Kay's portrayal tends to range from merely cruel and malicious, as in the Roman de Yder or Hartmann von Aue's Iwein to humorously derisive and even endearing, as in Durmart le Gallois and Escanor.

Despite his ubiquity, Kay's death is not a frequent subject in the Arthurian canon. In Welsh literature, it is mentioned he was killed by Gwyddawg and avenged by Arthur. In Geoffrey of Monmouth and the Alliterative Morte Arthure, he is killed in the war against the Roman Emperor Lucius, while the Vulgate Cycle describes his death in France, also in battle against the Romans. According to Malory's Book V, Kay does not die in the war against Rome. He is also not mentioned by Malory to die in Arthur's final battle, although this is ambiguous (some later interpretations suggested that he never participated in that battle).

== Modern culture ==
- Kay is a main character in the first three books of T. H. White's The Once and Future King, The Sword in the Stone and The Queen of Air and Darkness. His portrayal is based on Malory's account of Arthur's upbringing, but White adds a number of new elements to the story, including one in which the young Kay kills a dangerous griffin with the aid of Robin Hood and Maid Marian. White's Kay is quick-witted and often mean, but always a loving foster brother to Arthur, whom he calls "the Wart".
  - Kay appears in the 1963 Walt Disney Studios animated film adaptation of The Sword in the Stone, where he is voiced by actor Norman Alden. Though he is inept at jousting and sword fighting, Ector remains determined to groom him for knighthood and to possibly take the crown. Kay serves as a foil to Arthur, being self-centered, lazy, and outwardly boorish and bitter. Kay constantly bullies Arthur, and has a grudge against him, often trying to physically hurt him for his mistakes. However, when Arthur becomes king, Kay comes to respect Arthur as the king, as shown when he reluctantly bows down to Arthur at first, then does so sincerely, and also shows guilt for the way he treated him in the past.
- In the 1970s TV series Arthur of the Britons, Kai was played by Michael Gothard. In this version of the legend, Arthur is a Celtic chieftain and Kai is a Saxon orphan, raised together as brothers by an adoptive father, Llud, among the Celts. He is portrayed as somewhat hot-headed and sometimes distracted by female company, but a fiercely capable warrior (sometimes favouring an axe-weapon) and Arthur's most trusted and loyal friend.
- In Thomas Berger's 1978 Arthur Rex: A Legendary Novel, Kay is a somewhat foppish, sharp-tongued gourmand. Relieved to be freed from his bucolic upbringing in Wales, he takes charge of the kitchens at Camelot and yearns to make it a more sophisticated court. Arthur good-naturedly complains that Sir Kay is always serving him rich foods, when the king would rather just have simple meals. Kay supplies occasional comic relief in the book, but ultimately fights and dies with honour in the last battle against Mordred's host.
- Kay (portrayed by Niall O'Brien) is Arthur's loyal, but somewhat understated adopted brother in John Boorman's 1981 film Excalibur. He forgets his own sword before a joust and when Arthur draws Excalibur, he attempts to take credit. Later, he is one of the few knights who stay loyal to Arthur during Morgana's corruption of the land.
- Kay is the main character of Phyllis Ann Karr's 1982 novel The Idylls of the Queen. Expanding on a scene from the classic tales in which a knight is poisoned at Guinevere's feast and the queen is accused of the crime, Karr turns her story into a murder mystery with Kay as the detective attempting to discover the truth.
- A version of Sir Kay appears in the 1982-1985 DC Comics maxi-series Camelot 3000.
- In Marion Zimmer Bradley's 1983 The Mists of Avalon, Cai is Arthur's foster-brother. After a near fatal accident as a small child, Arthur is sent to live with Cai and his father, Ectorius. Cai and Arthur love each other very much, and after Arthur is crowned, he tells Cai, "God strike me if I ever ask that you, brother, should call me [king]." Cai is described as having a facial scar and a limp, two injuries that he received while protecting Arthur during a Saxon invasion. Cai is made Arthur's knight and chamberlain, and he keeps Arthur's castle for him.
- In Gillian Bradshaw's 1984 Down the Long Wind series, Cei is Arthur's infantry commander. He is a large man with fiery hair and a temper to match, but with a strong sense of honour and loyalty to Arthur.
- In Stephen R. Lawhead's Pendragon Cycle, Cai is Arthur's most loyal companion. As a child he had a crippled leg and Arthur was one of the few who defends him, which earns Arthur his complete and unquestioning loyalty. He dies in the battle against Mordred.
- In comedy TV series Kaamelott, he is portrayed as a rogue centurion and rival of Arthur named Caius who refused to follow his troops back to Rome and therefore Celticised his name and was given knighthood by Arthur to end their rivalry.
- He appears in Philip Reeve's 2007 Here Lies Arthur, as Cei, Arthur's loyal half-brother and friend to the bard Myrddin (Merlin) at the beginning, before their friendship wanes over his stories designed to improve Arthur's reputation. He is later murdered in person by a character known as 'The Irishman', while riding to the Irishman's aid against raiders. The Irishman attacked their camp overnight, on the order of Myrddin, as many viewed him as a superior leader to Arthur. The other members of Arthur's army who were untrusted were also killed by the Irishman and his soldiers. The main character, Gwyn/Gwyna, and Peredur (Percival), were the only two to escape and survive the attack.
- In the 2011 TV series Camelot, Kay is played by Canadian actor Peter Mooney. In this American-Irish-Canadian adaption of Arthurian Legend, Kay is portrayed as a loyal and protective older brother to Arthur. Although raised in a rural setting, he appears educated and somewhat idealistic, described by the actor who plays him as having "a world of book-smarts, but no practical experience [of how be a warrior]".
- In the Japanese light novel series, The Case Files of Lord El-Melloi II, part of the larger Fate (franchise) where many characters of the Arthurian legend appear (including but not limited to Lancelot, Gawain, and female versions of Mordred and Arthur himself, who's true name is Artoria), a copy of Sir Kay's soul from the time he was alive appears, stored in a magical weapon that lasted to the modern day. Sir Kay also appears or is mentioned in other Fate entries including Garden of Avalon and Fate/Grand Order.
- Sir Kay briefly appears in the season 5 opener of Once Upon a Time, where he betrays Arthur and attempts to pull Excalibur out of the stone to rule Camelot for himself. When he attempts to do so, he is proven unworthy, and the protection around the sword turns him to dust.
