= Ysgithyrwyn =

Legendary animal

Ysgithyrwyn Chief Boar (Gwen Jones tr.), Yskithyrwyn Benbaedd (Lady Guest tr.) (Welsh: Ysgithrwyn Pen Beidd, Yskithyrwynn Pennbeidd; Middle Welsh: yskithyrwyn penn beird, RBH; ẏskithẏr6ẏn WBR) or "White-tusk chief of Boars" is another boar being hunted, secondary to the great boar Twrch Trwyth by the Arthur's wild chase party in the Welsh Arthurian romance Culhwch ac Olwen.

Its tusk (Welsh: ysgithyr) was the necessary implement for shaving the giant Ysbaddaden Chief-Giant. Ysbaddaden proclaimed this tusk was no use to him unless extracted from the boar while still alive, and only Odgar the son of Aedd the king of Ireland was capable of accomplishing this.

This boar was slain (or at least chased down and cornered into inevitable death) not "by the dogs that Yspaddaden had mentioned, but by Cavall, Arthur's own dog.". In fact it was Kaw of North Britain (Cadw of Pydein, or Pictland), who, mounted on Arthur's mare Llamrei swung a battle-axe or hatchet (Welsh: bwyellic, bwyellig) at the boar and spliced its head. Thus it remains dubious whether the extraction of the tusk took place as the giant prescribed (i.e., while the boar was alive, or undertaken by Odgar). But Cadw/Kaw took charge of the tusk, in keeping with Arthur' earlier vow that no other would be entrusted with its care.
