= Cavall =

King Arthur's dog

Cavall (Middle Welsh: cauall RBH & WBR; modernized: Cafall; pronounced [kaˈvaɬ]; Latin: Cabal, var. Caball (ms.K)) was King Arthur's dog, used in the hunt for the great boar, Twrch Trwyth (Latin: Troynt, Troit).

Cavall was Arthur's "favourite dog", and during a stag hunt, he was customarily the last dog to be let loose to chase after the game (Gereint Son of Erbin).

== Historia Brittonum ==
Linked to the Welsh literature regarding Arthur's dog Cafall is the mention Arthur's dog Cabal's pawprint, preserved in rock, in the Latin tract of Historia Brittonum (9th century). The print was preserved in rock while the dog was pursuing the boar Troynt. The lore is preserved in the Wonders of Britain (De Mirabilibus Britanniae or Mirabilia in shorthand) appended to the Historia Brittonum. The wondrous nature of this cairn of stones was that even if someone removed that foot-printed stone to another spot, it would be back at its original heap the next day. (Note: Guest's notes also provides a sketch of the footprint (shown right) as well as facsimile of the Latin text from Harley 3859.)

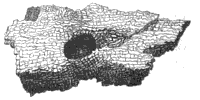
Sketch of a footprint stone from Carn Cavall, Lady Guest's Mabinogion (1849)

There is another marvel in the region which is called Buelt (≈Buellt). There is a mound of stones there and one stone placed above the pile with the pawprint of a dog in it. When Cabal, who was the dog of Arthur the soldier, was hunting the boar Troynt (recté Troit), he impressed his print in the stone, and afterwards Arthur assembled a stone mound under the stone with the print of his dog, and it is called the Carn Cabal (i.e., a cairn). And men come and remove the stone in their hands for the length of a day and a night; and on the next day it is found on top of its mound.

— J. A. Giles tr., Wonders of Britain §73

Lady Charlotte Guest was aware of the local lore that placed the monument at a mountain situated in the "district of Builth", the name by which that area was still being remembered from what was the ancient Buellt cantref of medieval Wales. Nowadays, this mountain is known as Carn Gafallt, but this identification is uncertain according to Geoffrey Ashe. The "Buelt" name is also preserved in present-day Builth Wells (in historic county of Brecknockshire) now part of county Powys.

== Culhwch ac Olwen ==
Unlike the simple primitive lore, the late Welsh romance Culhwch and Olwen weaves a much more intricate tale, naming many dogs besides Cavall in the hunting party, and the quarry is no longer just the boar Twrch Trwyth itself, its seven offspring (with names), and yet another boar named Yskithyrwyn besides.

=== Ysgithyrwyn Chief-Boar ===
Yskithyrwyn Penbaedd (or Ysgithyrwyn Chief Boar) was yet another boar to be hunted by Arthur's band; its tusk, which needed to be extracted while still alive, being another of the "impossible tasks" (anoeth; pl. anoethiau) prescribed by Ysbaddaden Chief-Giant. This tusk was the tool necessary for shaving the giant to groom him up, him being the father of the bride Olwen.

In Culhwch and Olwen, Arthur's dog Cavall is specifically credited with the slaying of Yskithyrwin (or at least with cornering the beast to its doom). Caw of Prydain who rides Arthur's mare Llamrei cleaves Yskithyrwyn's head with a hatchet.

Afterwards, "Bedwyr leading Cavall, Arthur's own dog", joins the other hunters and dogs to pursue the great boar Twrch Trwyth and its piglets. But the specific role played by Cavall is not told.

=== List of dogs ===
The other hounds, which either belonged to Arthur's retinue or were recruited elsewhere, include:

- The two (wolf?) pups of Gast Rhymhi (two whelps of the bitch Rhymhi),
  - The pups/cubs are possibly named Gwyddrud and Gwyddneu Astrus, though they are introduced as members of Arthur's court.
- Aned and Aethelm.
- Glas, Glessic, and Gleisad (Note: Besides Bromwich's edition, several modern translations interpret these as dogs' name, e.g. Jones & Jones: "Glas, Glesig Gleisad, their three dogs" or Davis: "Glas [Grey], Glesig, Gleisad [Salmon]--their three dogs. Call [Clever], Cuall [Quick], Cafall [Steed]--their three horses", etc.) (Note: However, Lady Guest parsed the text so that these were the three "grinding gashers", i.e., sword names. Translator Gantz(2003) agreed with the possibility they are sword names.) belonging to the three sons of Cleddyf Kyfwlch, named Bwlch, Kyfwlch, and Sefwlch.
- Drudwyn, the pup of Greid the son of Eri.
- two dogs of Glythmyr Ledewic (Glythfyr Ledewig).

==== Cavall the horse ====
Glas, Glesig, and Gleisad are referred to as dogs, and Call, Cuall, and Cafall as horses, and so on down the line, in the list of belongings of sons of Cleddyf, or, at least they are nowadays in modern translations. However, in the first English translation by Lady Guest, Glas, etc. were construed as sword names and Call, Cuall, Cavall as dogs, respectively.

== Etymology ==
Ifor Williams has made a study of occurrences of Cafall in old Welsh poetry.

A number of scholars have commented upon the similarity of the dog's name to the Latin word caballus for "horse". In an article from 1936, R. J. Thomas said that "the name Cabal is from Latin caballus 'horse', which he considers a quite natural metaphor since the dog was strong and swift, and he compares the horse of Conall Cernach which had a dog's head". Furthermore, the form cabal existed in Old Welsh.

Bromwich further remarks, "Since carn means both 'hoof' and 'cairn' it seems more probable that Cabal/Cafall originally designated Arthur horse.. rather than his hound".

== See also ==
- Husdent
- Hengroen
