= St Doged's Church, Llanddoged =

Church in Llanddoged, Conwy, Wales

Coordinates: 53.1570°N 3.7872°W

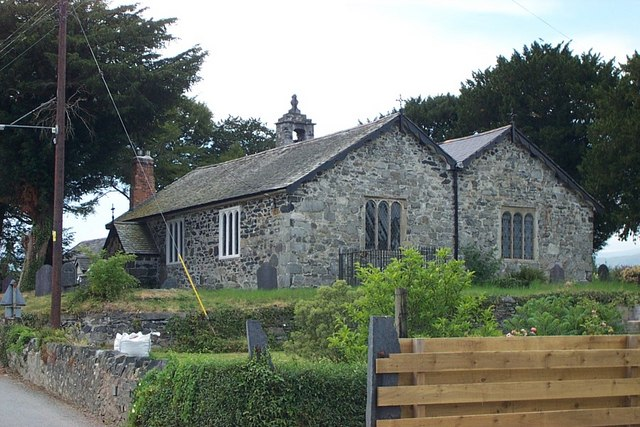
St Doged's Church, Llanddoged

St Doged's Church is a Grade II* listed medieval church in the village of Llanddoged, Conwy, Wales. The present building is built atop a pre-Christian burial mound and replaced an earlier church on the same site, originally built to house the remains of Saint Doged.

== Saint Doged ==
According to the Mabinogi tale Culhwch and Olwen, Saint Doged (sometimes Doged Frenin) was a king descended from Cunedda. Doged became a martyr after being killed by his rival Cilydd. Cilydd's wife Goleudydd died in childbirth, but before expiring she asked her husband to promise her that he would only remarry after he saw a double-headed thorn growing by her grave. Cilydd saw this sign seven years later and slew Doged. After acquiring Doged's wife and daughter. he proceeded to pair his son Culhwch with his new stepsister. Culhwch's subsequent rejection of his stepsister would become the catalyst for the events in the medieval tale of Culhwch and Olwen.

== History ==
The first church on the site of the present building was founded in the sixth century and was dedicated to Saint Doged. The original building was a martyrium reputedly built over the grave of the saint, which is believed to have been located in the walled area which forms the present churchyard. There is a well dedicated to Saint Doged (Ffynnon Ddoged) located 50 metres north of the Church.

The church was mentioned in the Lincoln Taxation of 1291.

Welsh writer of interludes and ballads Elis Roberts (Elis y Cowper) was laid to rest at St Doged's church on 1 December 1789.

== Architecture ==
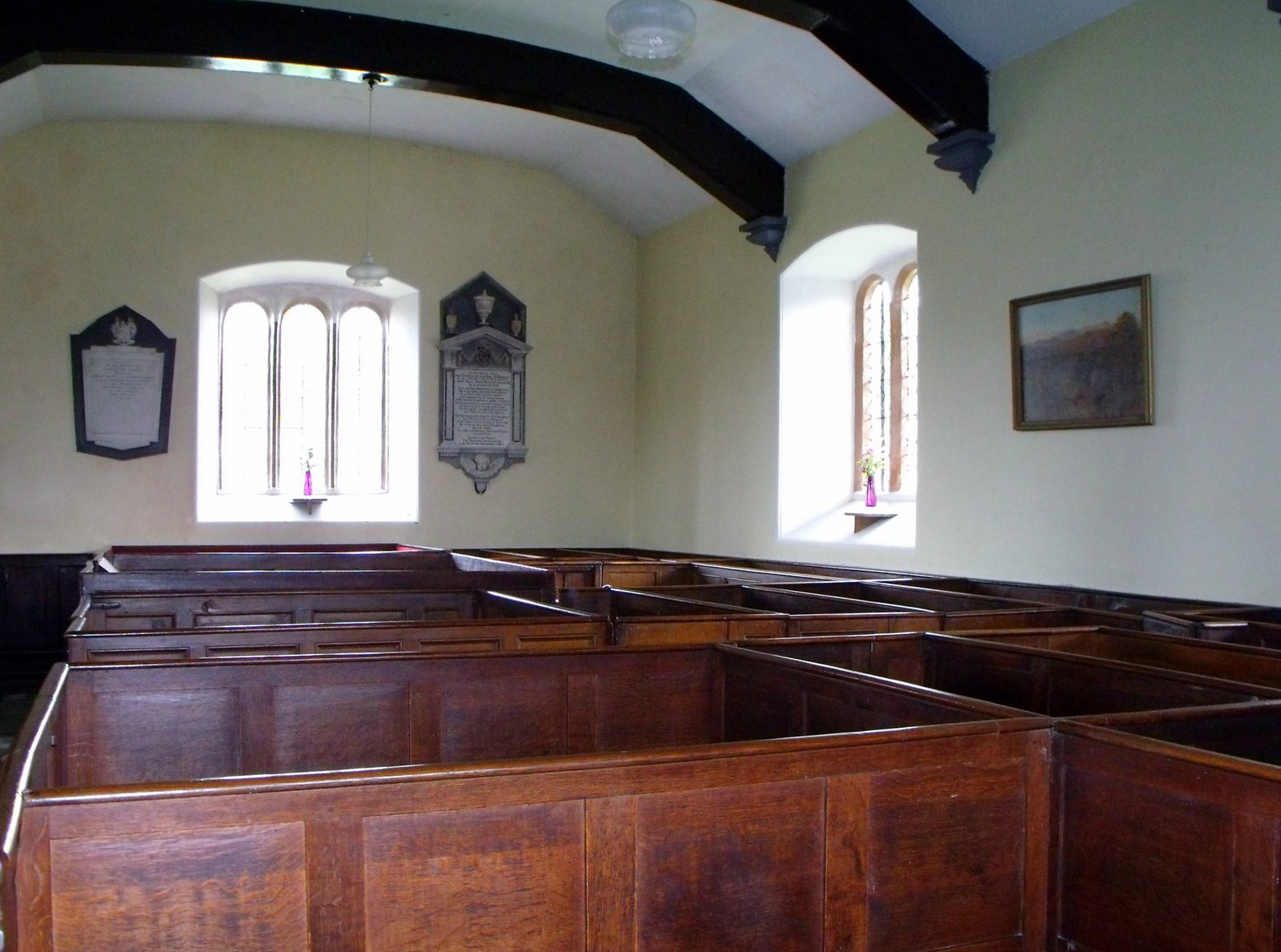
Box pews at St. Doged's

The church is late medieval in date and is twin-naved. It is enclosed within a raised, circular churchyard due to its location atop a pre-Christian burial mound. Some original 16th Century arched-light windows survive in the present building. The pulpit is octagonal and dates to the 19th Century

The pews inside the church have an unusual arrangement. They are arranged in square boxes, not unlike those found in Nonconformist chapels, but are rare inside Anglican churches. The pews were installed inside the church in the 1830s when the chapel was rebuilt. The rebuilding was overseen by Rev. Thomas Davies and his friend Rev. David Owen of Eglwysbach, who were keen to stem the flow of congregants leaving to attend Nonconformist chapels. At the western end, the tiered seating still bears the words 'boys and girls'.
