= Gatekeeper =

Person who controls access to something

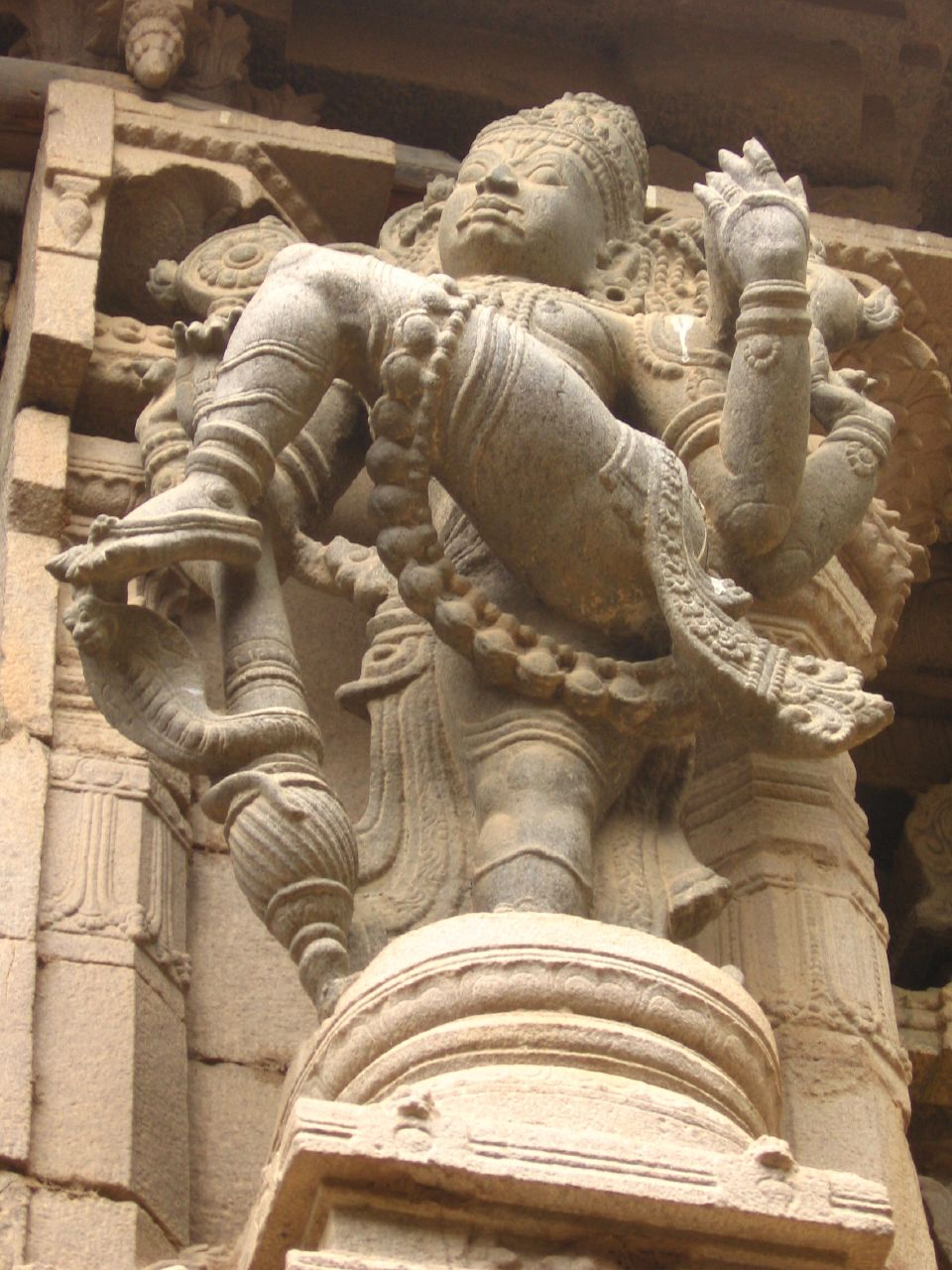
A Hindu gatekeeper at the Srivaikuntanathan Permual Temple in Tamil Nadu

A gatekeeper is a person who controls access to something, for example via a city gate or bouncer, or more abstractly, controls who is granted access to a category or status. Gatekeepers assess who is "in or out", in the classic words of management scholar Kurt Lewin.

Various figures in the religions and mythologies of the world serve as gatekeepers of paradisal or infernal realms, granting or denying access to these realms, depending on the credentials of those seeking entry. Figures acting in this capacity may also undertake the status of watchman, interrogator or judge. In the late 20th century the term came into more metaphorical use, referring to individuals or bodies that decide whether a given message will be distributed by a mass medium.

== Gatekeeping roles ==
Gatekeepers serve in various roles including academic admissions, financial advising, and news editing, along with many areas of the fine arts. An academic admissions officer might review students' qualifications based on criteria like test scores, race, social class, grades, family connections, religion, and even athletic ability. Where this internal gatekeeping role is unwanted, open admissions can externalize it.

Various gatekeeping organizations administer professional certifications to protect clients from fraud and unqualified advice, for example for financial advisers.

A news editor selects stories for publication based on his or her organization's specific criteria, e.g., importance and relevance to their readership. For example, a presidential resignation would be on the front page of a newspaper but likely not a celebrity break-up (unless the paper was of the gossip variety).

Other people gatekeeping roles are in mental health service, clergy, police, hairdressers, and bartenders because of their extensive contact with the public.

Gatekeeper is also a term used in business to identify the person who is responsible for controlling passwords and access rights or permissions for software that the company uses.

One critique of gatekeeping roles is the potential to create or reinforce inequality, for example if entry is made more difficult for minority applicants or artists. For example, Bernardine Evaristo was only the first black woman to win the prestigious Man Booker Prize in fiction in 2019, a joint award with author Margaret Atwood.

The term may apply literally to a domestic servant with the job of guarding the main entrance to the estate.

== Academic peer review ==
Peer review is a practice widely used by specialized journals that publish articles reporting new research, new discoveries, or new analyses in a specific academic field or area of focus. Journal editors ask one or more subject matter experts deemed to be "peers" of an article's author or authors to assess an article's suitability for publication in the journal. Notwithstanding the fact that the intent of peer review is to ensure suitability and editorial quality, issues of preference or exclusion of articles are raised from time to time relating to the intellectual prejudices, career rivalries, or other biases of the journal editors or peer reviewers.

== Credentials ==
Credentialing is the practice of evidencing suitability for engaging in a profession or for employability through documentation of demonstrated competency or experience, completion of education or training, or other criteria as specified by a credentialing authority. The documentation provided by the authority is known as "credentials", and may be in the form of a license, certificate of competency, diploma, teaching credential, board certification, or a similar document. Credentialism refers to the practice of relying on credentials to prove the suitability of a professional person or a skilled employee to be assigned the responsibilities of professional engagement or employment.

Employers may use such gatekeeping methods to ensure competence for the job or to accede to the pressures of organizations that award credentials to require specific credentials.

== See also ==
- Gatekeeping (communication)
- Gatekeeper's lodge
- Glewlwyd Gafaelfawr
- Heimdallr
- Janus
- Liminal deity
- Papa Legba
- Porter (college)
- Principal–agent problem
- Saint Peter
