= Elis Roberts (Elis y Cowper) =

Ellis Roberts (Elis y Cowper) (1712–1789) was a Welsh author of interludes and a composer of ballads.

== Background ==
Roberts was born in Llanycil, near Bala, Wales. By the 1740s he had moved to live in Llanddoged in Conwy Valley. Like his bardic name suggests, Roberts worked as a cooper in the daytime. The work of a cooper involves creating casks and barrels for beer, wine, liquor and other liquids. The cooper would also make wooden vessels and equipment for dairies, such as buckets and equipment for churning.

== Personal life ==
Roberts was married four times and widowed three times. There are no surviving records about the name of his first wife, who was from Bala and died a year-and-a-half after they were wed. The names of his other wives were Elin, Elizabeth and Grace (née Williams). Roberts had at least ten children with his wives.

Like many contemporary interlude writers such as Twm o'r Nant and Huw Jones, Roberts frequently satirised the Methodists, decrying the preaching which was carried out by them in the towns and villages. Gruffudd Glyn Evans writes of Roberts that "in spite of his love of using the stage as a pulpit" Roberts was opposed to Methodism, engaging in the same activity which he condemned when carried out by the itinerant Methodist preachers. The impact of religion subsequently caused Roberts to "overload his later interludes with tedious moral dissertations" and forego the ribaldry traditional in the interlude genre.

== Interludes ==
In his introduction to the interlude Gras a Natur, 1769, Roberts claims to have written sixty-nine interludes. However, only nine of his interludes have survived, including:

- Argulus (c. 1756)
- Jeils (c. 1757)
- Oliffernes a Jiwdath (1766)
- Gras a Natur (1769)
- Tair Rhan Oes Dyn (bef. 1771)
- Y Ddau Gyfamod (1777)
- Pedwar Chwarter y Flwyddyn (1787)
- Cristion a Drygddyn (1788)

Roberts' interludes typically focus on complaints about high prices, the extravagance of the wealthy, the cost of maintaining militias and satirising religious groups which Roberts opposed, such as the Puritans and the Methodists. His interludes touch on problems both at home and abroad; his 1777 interlude Y Ddau Gyfamod concerns the American Revolutionary War.

== Death ==
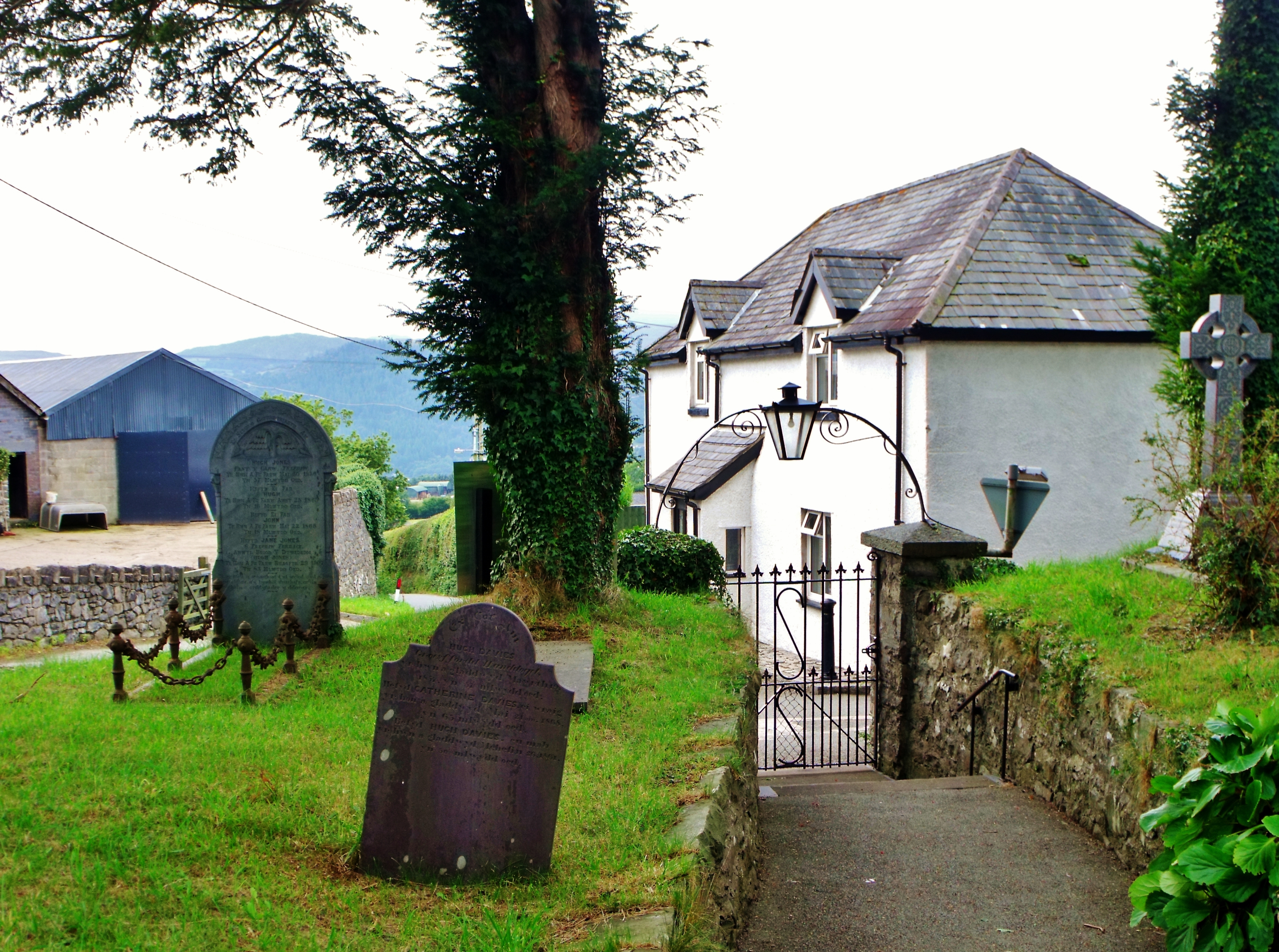
Churchyard of St Doged's Church, Llandoged, where Roberts is buried

Roberts died on the 27th November 1789 and was laid to rest in the cemetery of Saint Doged's Church, Llanddoged.

== Literature ==
=== About Elis y Cowper ===
- Llên y Llenor: Elis y Cowper; G.G. Evans
- Llyfrau Llafar Gwlad: 93. Elis y Cowper - Brenin y Baledi; Cynfael Lake
