= Hengroen =

Stallion owned by King Arthur in Welsh folklore

Hengroen was a stallion owned by King Arthur, according to the Welsh tale Culhwch and Olwen.

== See also ==
- Llamrei
- List of fictional horses
