= Goreu fab Custennin =

Hero of Welsh mythology

Goreu fab Custennin (also spelled as Gorau) is a hero of Welsh and early Arthurian mythology, the son of Custennin, and cousin to Arthur, Culhwch and Saint Illtud through their grandfather Amlawdd Wledig. He is a significant character in the Middle Welsh Arthurian tale Culhwch and Olwen, and also appears in a number of other medieval texts. His name may be derived from Gorneu; "of Cornwall."

== Role in Welsh tradition ==
=== How Culhwch won Olwen ===
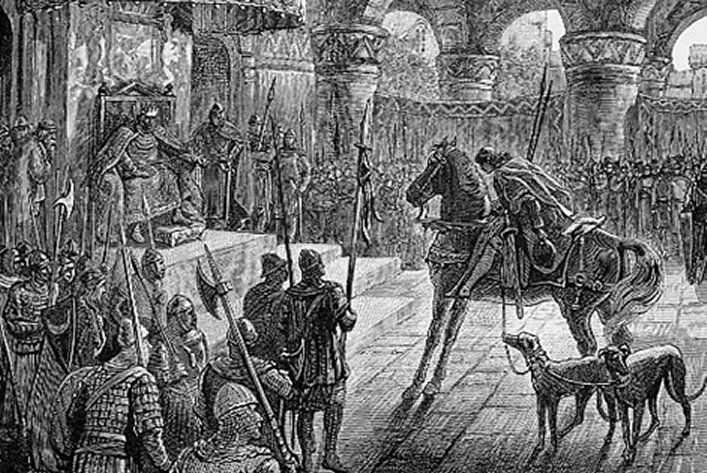
Culhwch entering Arthur's Court in the Welsh tale Culhwch and Olwen, 1881

While on the quest to locate the stronghold of Ysbaddaden Bencawr, Culhwch ap Cilydd and his six companions come across a shepherd and his flock. They learn that he is Ysbaddaden's brother, and that the giant has murdered twenty-three of his twenty four children. In a bid to save their youngest son from suffering the same fate, the shepherd and his wife hide him away in a chest. Cai, one of Arthur's foremost knights, offers to take the boy with him on the quest for Olwen, promising to fight to the death to protect him. The unnamed child later assists Cai and Bedwyr in the murder of Wrnach the Giant, fighting through three courtyards of the giant's llys. It is through this adventure that he earns his name, Goreu; "The Best."

It is Goreu who ultimately slays Ysbaddaden, dragging him to the mound by his hair and there decapitating him. He then placed the head on a stake on the citadel and claims his fort and territory as his own, thus avenging the deaths of his brothers.

=== Other appearances ===
He later appears in the Arthurian romance Geraint fab Erbin in which he is named as one of the four squires of Arthur's court and rides alongside the hero Geraint on his journey to Cornwall. In Breuddwyd Rhonabwy, he appears briefly as one of Arthur's twenty-four chief councillors. The Welsh Triads refer to a tradition in which Goreu rescued Arthur from three enchanted otherworldy prisons."
