= Here Lies Arthur =

2007 young adult novel by Philip Reeve

- Front cover of first edition
- Author: Philip Reeve
- Language: English
- Genre: Children's adventure novel, historical novel
- Publisher: Scholastic UK
- Publication date: 2 April 2007
- Publication place: United Kingdom
- Pages: 289 pp (first edition)
- ISBN: 978-0-439-95533-1
- OCLC: 77540798
- LC Class: PZ7.R25576 He 2008

Here Lies Arthur is a young-adult novel by Philip Reeve, published by Scholastic in 2007. Set in fifth or sixth century Britain and the Anglo-Saxon invasion, it features a girl who participates in the deliberate construction of legendary King Arthur during the man's lifetime, orchestrated by a bard. Reeve calls it a back-creation: not a genuine historical novel as it is not based on actual specific events; rather it is "back-created" from the legends, giving them a "realistic" origin.

Reeve won the annual Carnegie Medal, recognising the year's best children's book published in the UK.

Scholastic published the first US edition in November 2008.

== Plot summary ==
The novel starts with an attack by Arthur (aka. The bear) and his war-band, and the escape of Gwyna, a servant girl. She is found by Myrddin, a bard who hopes to build Arthur's reputation as a great hero so that he can unite the native British against the Saxons who have occupied the east of the country. Myrddin tells Gwyna to give Arthur Caliburn while pretending to be the Lady of the Lake. When she does that successfully, Myrddin disguises her in boy's clothes so that she can travel with the war-band as his servant.

During her travels, she meets a boy who was brought up as a girl, tricks a holy man, swims in the Roman baths of Aquae Sulis, takes part in a battle, and witnesses Arthur's brutality, piety and immorality, all the while observing her master create the fantastic stories that have made 'King Arthur' one of the most famous men in legend. After Arthur's death she creates some stories herself, conceding that the legend is more important than the mere facts.

== Characters ==
- Gwyna/Gwyn: the narrator, a servant girl who serves Myrddin and spends much of the book disguised as a boy
- Myrddin: her master, a Celtic bard, Arthur's adviser
- Arthur, nicknamed the Bear: the leader of a Romano-British war-band
- Gwenhwyfar: a relative of Ambrosius Aurelianus, later Arthur's wife, later has an affair with Bedwyr
- Valerius: defender of Aquae Sulis, Gwenhwyfar's first husband
- Cei: Arthur's half-brother and a friend to Myrddin
- Bedwyr: Gwyn's friend, later Gwenhwyfar's lover, one of the best soldiers
- Medrawt: Bedwyr's older brother, a warrior
- Peredur: son of a famous warrior, raised as a girl by his widowed mother, later Gwyna's lover, childhood name Peri
- Saint Porroc: self-proclaimed holy man, leader of a group of worldly monks
- Maelwas of Dumnonia, overlord of the southern kingdoms

== Reception ==
Carnegie judges (librarians) described Here Lies Arthur as enjoyable and thought-provoking, a "page-turner of a novel", adding that "Reeve cleverly makes the story relevant to today by examining the versions of history that are handed down to us, and the ways in which myths are created."

Beside the 2008 Carnegie Medal Here Lies Arthur was bronze runner up for the final Nestlé Smarties Book Prize, ages category 9–11 years. It made the Booktrust Teenage Prize shortlist and the Manchester Book Award longlist. in 2008.

Five years after its publication, WorldCat reports that Here Lies Arthur is Reeve's work most widely held in participating libraries.

== See also ==
Awards
Preceded by Just in Case	Carnegie Medal recipient 2008	Succeeded by Bog Child
