= Goleuddydd =

In the Middle Welsh prose tale Culhwch ac Olwen, Goleuddydd (Welsh pronunciation: [ˈɡɔlai̯ diːð], meaning 'light of day' from Welsh golau 'light' and dydd 'day') is the daughter of Amlawdd Wledig, and is desired by Cilydd, who marries her. She becomes pregnant with his child, but goes mad and turns to wandering the countryside. When she is near to giving birth, her senses return, and she takes shelter with a swineherd. Frightened by the pigs, she gives birth to a boy, apparently in a pig run. The swineherd takes the baby away to be baptised as Culhwch; he becomes the protagonist of Culhwch and Olwen.

Following the birth, Goleuddydd becomes fatally ill and, before dying, exhorts her husband not to remarry until he sees a briar with two blossoms on her grave. Cilydd agrees, and Goleuddydd eventually dies. Goleuddydd orders her confessor to visit her grave every year and keep it well trimmed, lest anything should grow there. Cilydd sends an attendant to her grave every day, to look for the briar. After seven years of this, the confessor neglects his duties. One day whilst out hunting, apparently several years later, Cilydd happens upon the grave, and sees upon it a briar with two blossoms. He takes this as a sign to remarry. He kills King Doged at some point and marries his widow.
