= Mabon ap Modron =

Welsh mythological character

Mabon ap Modron is a figure from Welsh mythology where he is the son of Modron and a member of Arthur's war band. Both he and his mother were likely deities in origin, descending from a divine mother–son pair. Mabon has been equated with the mythological hero Pryderi fab Pwyll as well as with a minor Arthurian character known as Mabon ab Mellt. His literary echo may be found in several continental Arthurian romance characters and in some of their English adaptations.

== Etymology and origin ==
His name and figure is related to the Romano-British god of youth Maponos (a Celtic equivalent of Apollo), whose name means "Great Son". His mother, Modron, in turn, is likely related to the Gaulish goddess Dea Matrona. The name Mabon is derived from the Common Brittonic and Gaulish deity name Maponos "Great Son", from the Proto-Celtic root *makwo- "son". Similarly, Modron is derived from the name of the Brittonic and Gaulish deity Mātronā, meaning "Great Mother", from Proto-Celtic *mātīr "mother". According Roger Sherman Loomis, Mabon, the "Great Youth", also appears under the names Gwair and Pryderi. His counterpart in the Irish mythology is the god of youth Aengus (Óengus) Mac ing Óg.

== Welsh tradition ==
=== Culhwch ac Olwen ===
After Culhwch and his companions manage to defeat the antagonist, the giant Ysbaddaden, the latter relents and agrees to give Culhwch his daughter Olwen on the condition that he completes a number of impossible tasks (anoethau), including hunting the giant boar Twrch Trwyth and recovering the exalted prisoner, Mabon son of Modron, the only man able to hunt the dog Drudwyn, in turn the only dog who can track Twrch Trwyth. King Arthur and his men learn that Mabon was stolen from his mother's arms when he was three nights old, and question the world's oldest and wisest animals about his whereabouts, until they are led to the salmon of Llyn Llyw, the oldest animal of them all. The enormous salmon carries Arthur's men Cei and Bedwyr downstream to Mabon's prison in Gloucester; they hear him through the walls, singing a lamentation for his fate. The rest of Arthur's men launch an assault on the front of the prison, while Cei and Bedwyr sneak in the back and rescue Mabon. He subsequently plays a key role in the hunt for Twrch Trwyth.

=== Other appearances ===
One of the earliest direct reference to Mabon can be found in the tenth century poem Pa Gur, in which Arthur recounts the feats and achievements of his knights so as to gain entrance to a fortress guarded by Glewlwyd Gafaelfawr, the eponymous porter. The poem relates that Mabon fab Mydron (Modron) is one of Arthur's followers, and is described as a "servant to Uther Pendragon". A second figure, Mabon fab Mellt, is described as having "stained the grass with blood". He further appears in the medieval tale The Dream of Rhonabwy, in which he fights alongside Arthur at the Battle of Badon and is described as one of the king's chief advisors.

== Derived characters ==
Mabon the son of Modron is almost certainly related to several continental (French and German) Arthurian romance figures: often magical, sometimes villainous, sometimes a giant, sometimes known as the Black Knight. Such characters may include those known as Mabon/Maboun (an enchanter in Le Bel Inconnu; as Maboun[nys] in the English Libeaus Desconus), Mabon/Nabon le Noir[e] (different characters of a giant in the Prose Tristan and an enchanter in the Post-Vulgate Merlin Continuation; the name in turn also inspired that of the knight Nabon le Noyre/Noire in the English Le Morte d'Arthur), Mabonagrain/Mabonagrein (a giant in Erec and Enide), Mabuz (a fairy prince in Lanzelot), Madoc/Maduc le Noir/li Noirs (a knight in the Livre d'Artus and La Vengeance Raguidel).
