= Llamrei =

Mare owned by King Arthur in Welsh folklore

Llamrei (Welsh pronunciation: [ɬamˈrɛi]) was a mare owned by King Arthur, according to the Welsh tale "Culhwch and Olwen" this horse was used to hunt and kill a boar.

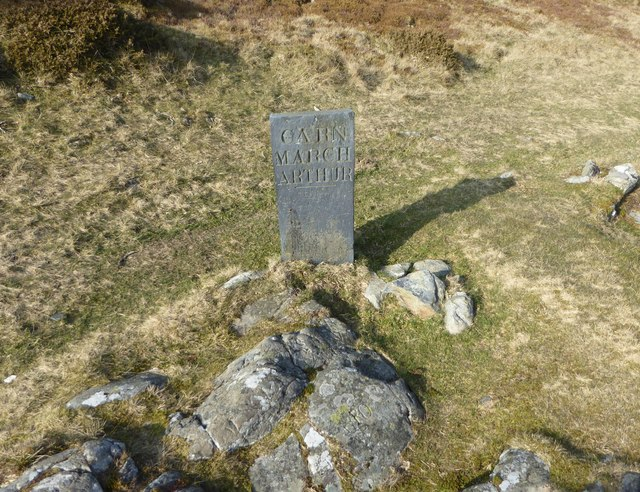
Carn March Arthur

Close to Llyn Barfog in Wales is a petrosomatoglyph in the shape of a hoof-print, etched deep into the rock "Carn March Arthur", or the "Stone of Arthur's Horse". This was supposedly made by King Arthur's mount, Llamrei, either when the horse jumped from a clif to avoid invading Saxons or when the horse was hauling the terrible Addanc, or "afanc" monster, from the lake.

== See also ==
- Hengroen
- List of historical horses
