= Culhwch =

Figure in Welsh mythology

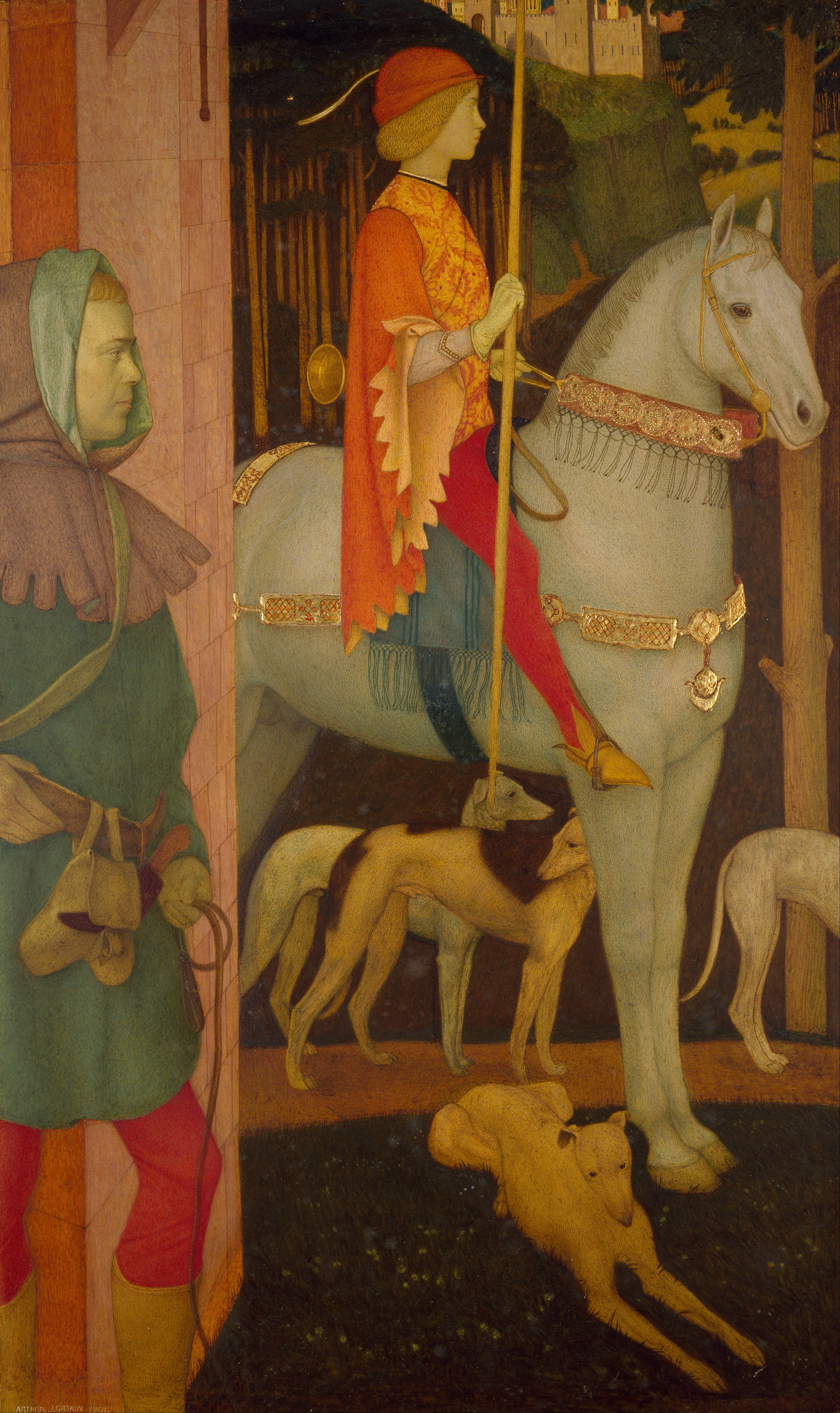
Kilhwych, the King's Son (1901) by Arthur Joseph Gaskin

Culhwch (Welsh pronunciation: [ˈkɨlhʊχ], with the final consonant sounding like Scottish "loch"), in Welsh mythology, is the son of Cilydd son of Celyddon and Goleuddydd, a cousin of Arthur and the protagonist of the story Culhwch and Olwen (the earliest of the medieval Welsh tales appended to Lady Charlotte Guest's edition of the Mabinogion). In this tale the etymology of Culhwch is explained as "sow run" (cul 'narrow, a narrow thing'; hwch 'sow, pig'), but this is likely to be folk etymology. According to the narrative, Culhwch is born to his maddened mother Goleuddydd after she is frightened by a herd of swine. The swineherd finds Culhwch in the pigs' run, and takes him back to his father Cilydd. Culhwch is described as being "of gentle lineage".

== In Culhwch and Olwen ==
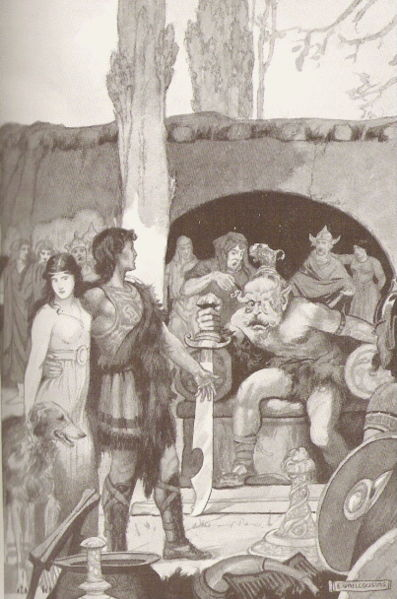
Culhwch at Ysbaddaden's court. Image by E. Wallcousins in Celtic Myth & Legend, Charles Squire, 1920. "Horses shall I have, and chivalry; and my lord and kinsman Arthur will obtain for me all these things. And I shall gain thy daughter, and thou shalt lose thy life." "Go forward...and when thou hast compassed all these marvels, thou shalt have my daughter for thy wife."

Culhwch's father, King Cilydd son of Celyddon, loses his wife Goleuddydd after a difficult childbirth. When he remarries, the young Culhwch rejects his stepmother's attempt to pair him with his new stepsister. Offended, the new queen puts a curse on him so that he can marry no one besides the beautiful Olwen, daughter of the giant Ysbaddaden. Though he has never seen her, Culhwch becomes infatuated with her, but his father warns him that he will never find her without the aid of his famous cousin Arthur. The young man immediately sets off to seek his kinsman. He finds him at his court in Celliwig in Cornwall and asks for support and assistance.

Arthur agrees to help, and sends six warriors to join Culhwch in his search for Olwen. They travel onwards until they come across the "fairest of the castles of the world", and meet Ysbaddaden's shepherd brother, Custennin. They learn that the castle belongs to Ysbaddaden, that he stripped Custennin of his lands and murdered twenty-three of the shepherd's children out of cruelty. The warrior Cai pledges to protect the twenty-fourth son, Goreu with his life. Custennin sets up a meeting between Culhwch and Olwen, and the maiden agrees to lead Culhwch and his companions to Ysbadadden's castle.

The knights attack the castle by stealth, killing the nine porters and the nine watchdogs, and enter the giant's hall. Upon their arrival, Ysbaddaden attempts to kill Culhwch with a poison dart, but is outwitted and wounded, first by Bedwyr, then by the enchanter Menw, and finally by Culhwch himself. Eventually, Ysbaddaden relents, and agrees to give Culhwch his daughter on the condition that he completes a number of impossible tasks (anoethau), including hunting the Twrch Trwyth and recovering the exalted prisoner Mabon ap Modron. Culhwch accepts the giant's child and, with the help of Arthur and his knights, eventually completes the numerous tasks.

With the anoethau completed, Culhwch, Goreu and others who "wished ill to Ysbaddaden Bencawr" ride to his court. The giant's beard, skin and flesh are shaved off by Caw of Pictland and, accepting his humiliation and defeat, he is dragged away by Goreu, who avenges his murdered brothers by beheading the giant. Ysbaddaden's head is placed on the spike of the citadel, Goreu claims his uncle's lands as his own, and Olwen is free to marry her love.

== Other appearances ==
A brief reference to Culhwch is made in Marwnad Cynddylan, a probably seventh-century awdl-poem, in which the mythological hero is compared to the deceased Cynddylan, a seventh-century ruler of Pengwern.
