= Ysbaddaden =

Primary antagonist of the Welsh romance Culhwch and Olwen

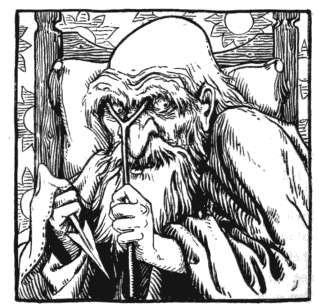
So huge is his frame, Ysbaddaden requires great forks to prop up his eyelids. Illustration by John D. Batten (1892)

Ysbaddaden Bencawr; "Ysbaddaden, Chief of Giants" (from roots meaning "hawthorn" or "infertile" - or perhaps implying both meanings), is the primary antagonist of the Welsh romance Culhwch and Olwen. A vicious giant residing in a nigh unreachable castle, he is the father of Olwen and uncle of Goreu fab Custennin.

== Mythology ==
Culhwch's father, King Cilydd son of Celyddon, loses his wife Goleuddydd after a difficult childbirth. When Cilydd remarries after brutally murdering his new wife's former husband, King Doged, the young Culhwch rejects his stepmother's attempt to pair him with his new stepsister. Offended, the new queen puts a curse on him so that he can marry no one besides the beautiful Olwen, daughter of the giant Ysbaddaden. Though he has never seen her, Culhwch becomes infatuated with her, but his father warns him that he will never find her without the aid of his famous cousin Arthur. The young man immediately sets off to seek his kinsman. He finds him at his court in Celliwig in Cornwall and asks for support and assistance.

Arthur agrees to help, and sends six warriors to join Culhwch in his search for Olwen. They travel onwards until they come across the "fairest of the castles of the world", and meet Ysbaddaden's shepherd brother, Custennin. They learn that the castle belongs to Ysbaddaden, that he stripped Custennin of his lands and murdered the shepherd's twenty-three children out of cruelty. Custennin set up a meeting between Culhwch and Olwen, and the maiden agrees to lead Culhwch and his companions to Ysbaddaden's castle. The warrior Cai pledges to protect the twenty-fourth son, Goreu, with his life.

The knights attack the castle by stealth, killing the nine porters and the nine watchdogs, and enter the giant's hall. Upon their arrival, Ysbaddaden attempts to kill Culhwch with a poison dart, but is outwitted and wounded, first by Bedwyr, then by the enchanter Menw, and finally by Culhwch himself. Eventually, Ysbaddaden relents, and agrees to give Culhwch his daughter on the condition that he complete a number of impossible tasks (anoethau), including hunting the Twrch Trwyth and recovering the exalted prisoner Mabon ap Modron. Culhwch accepts the giant's challenge and, with the help of Arthur and his knights, eventually completes the numerous tasks.

With the anoethau completed, Culhwch, Goreu and others who "wished ill to Ysbaddaden Bencawr" ride to his court. The giant's beard, skin and flesh are shaved off by Caw of Pictland and, accepting his humiliation and defeat, he is dragged away by Goreu, who avenges his murdered brothers by beheading the giant. Ysbaddaden's head is placed on the spike of the citadel, Goreu claims his uncle's lands as his own, and Olwen is free to marry her love.

Although medical interpretation by modern authors is fraught, it is notable that Ysbaddaden's name might imply the infertility and dermatitis (red and white scaly skin mimicking the red and white flowers of hawthorn) which accompanies gigantism caused by acromegaly. Additionally, wounds given the giant can be read as descriptions of arthritis and other features of acromegaly.

== See also ==
- Balor
- Viy (story)
