= Twrch Trwyth =

Wild boar from Arthurian legend

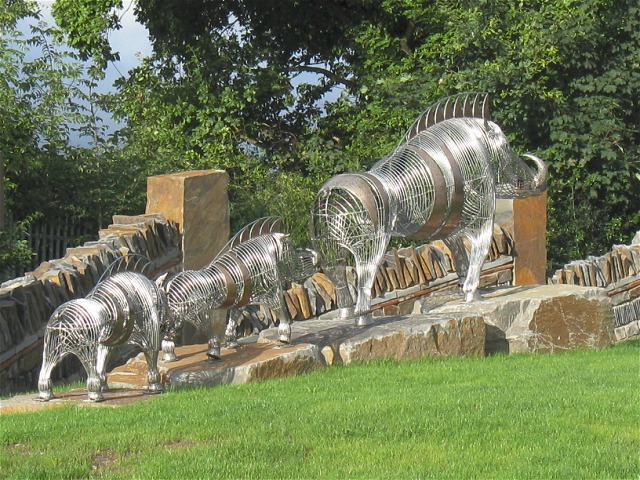
- Twrch Trwyth sculpture by Tony Woodman
- Children: 7: Grugyn Gwrych Ereint (~Silver-bristle); Llwydawg Govynnyad (~the Hewer); Twrch Lllawin; Gwys; Banw; Bennwig; one unnamed boar
- Parent: Taredd Wledig

Twrch Trwyth (Welsh pronunciation: [tuːɾχ tɾʊɨθ]; also Welsh: Trwyd) is a fabulous wild boar in Arthurian legend. A richly elaborate account of its hunt is described in the Welsh prose romance Culhwch and Olwen, which was probably written around 1100.

Its hunt involved King Arthur and his hosts and his hound Cafall, and was also deemed to require other recruited men of talent, other hounds, and additional equipment such as a leash, according to the tasks (anoetheu) prescribed by the giant Ysbaddaden, though events did not always unfold as the giant foretold. The boar was brought out of Ireland, driven to Britain, and finally shoved off a cliff into the sea at Cornwall.

The legend, in simpler form, dates much earlier, since Arthur's use of his hound Cavall (Latin: Cavall (base text, MS. MS. H), Latin: caball (MS. K), Latin: caballusMS. D^{1}), Latin: caballus(MSS. D^{2} G) to hunt the boar (Latin: Troynt (base text, MSS.H K), Troit (MSS.C^{1} D G Q); or Terit (MSS. C^{2} L)) is glimpsed in a piece of geographical onomasticon composed in Latin in the ninth century, the Historia Brittonum.

A passing reference in the elegy Gwarchan Cynfelyn (7th century), preserved in the Book of Aneirin, is reckoned to be its earliest mention in literature. (Note: Lady Guest (1849) had noticed this occurrence. Later, Rhys (1885) credits Daniel Silvan Evans for noticing it, and naming Evans as translator of the poem in Skene ed., Four Ancient Books, Vol. 1.) Trwyth is also mentioned in several other pieces of poetry from the Middle Welsh period.

The name in Welsh can be construed to mean "the boar Trwyth", and past scholars argued it may be analogous to the boar Triath of Irish mythology (see #Etymology and Irish cognate below).

== Historia Brittonum ==
The earliest reference to Trwyth in the Arthurian context occurs in the tract De Mirabilibus Britanniae (or Mirabilia in shorthand), variously titled in English as "Wonders of Britain". The Mirabilia though probably a separate work, believed to be near-contemporaneous to pseudo-Nennius's early ninth-century Historia Brittonum.

It claims that Arthur was chasing the great boar Troynt [recte Troit] assisted by his dog Cabal, and the dog left its pawprint in rock, somewhere in the region of "Buelt"[≈Buellt, the cantref of medieval Wales], while pursuing the boar. The boar Troynt /Troit is identifiable with Trwyth Trwyth of the Welsh romance of Culhwch, while the dog is also recognizable as the dog Cavall of Welsh literature.

Lady Charlotte Guest has conjectured that the route in pursuit of Twrch Trwyth (according to the Welsh romance source) must have passed through this cairn: "..across Carn Cavall and the Brecon Mountains [Brecon Beacons?] to Abergwy [the mouth of the Wye], where the Wye falls into the Severn below Chepstow".

== Culhwch and Olwen ==
Twrch is named as the son of Prince Taredd (Taredd Wledig), transformed by God for his sins into the form of a swine (hwch); he has venom-dripping bristles, and carries a comb, a pair of scissors, and a razor on his head between his ears.

Culhwch is assigned the task (anoeth; pl. anoetheu) by Ysbaddaden, the giant whose daughter Olwen Culhwch seeks, of obtaining the comb and scissors from Twrch's head. Later in the story it transpires there is also a razor secreted there. These implements are then to be used to cut and treat Ysbaddaden's hair (most of the tasks on the giant's long list are ultimately to do with this ceremony of hair-cutting). Further, Ysbaddaden states that the only hound who can hunt Twrch is Drudwyn, the whelp of Greid, and then goes on to list the requirements of the leash, collar, and chain needed to hold the dog, and Mabon ap Modron who must be recruited as the sole person capable of handling this dog Drudwyn for the hunt. Additional dogs (the two whelps of the bitch Rhymhi, which will need leashes; (Note: Sheehan (2005), p. 7 spells as "Rhymi" but cites Bromwich & Evans (1992), p. xlviii to note that these whelps are "an anoeth [whose accomplishment] is missing from the text" and that the whelps (their leash) are "to hunt Twrch Trwyth".) also Aned and Aethlem) will be needed to hunt the boar, as well as additional manpower and accoutrements. Although the sword (cledyf) of Wrnach the giant is prescribed as the sole weapon capable of killing the boar, (Note: The reconstructed form *Gwrnach, supposed by John Rhys and T. F. O'Rahilly has since fallen out of favour, Bromwich & Evans (1992), p. 138.) it is used by Arthur's men to commit murder of the giant, but does not get used upon the boar (Note: The boar is driven off the cliff, see below.) Ultimately Ysbaddaden calls on Culhwch to seek out Arthur, Culhwch's cousin, to help him hunt Twrch.

The hunt for Twrch takes up the greater portion of the latter half of Culhwch and Olwen, and it is described in great detail, including the geographical route of the pursuit, and those who take active part in it. Although it is Culhwch who is given the task, it is Arthur and his men who take the most prominent role in the chase, Culhwch having successfully enlisted his aid.

Twrch Trwyth and its seven offspring were found by Arthur's host travelling to Ireland, but thence driven to Wales, and finally to Cornwall: Menw son of Teirgwaedd is sent as a flying scout over Ireland to verify that the comb and scissors are between Twrch's ears. He takes the form of a bird and flies to Twrch's lair, encountering the boar with seven piglets. Menw then tries to swoop down and snatch one of the implements from Twrch's scalp, but only manages to take one silver bristle; Twrch is agitated and shakes himself, scattering venom onto Menw, wounding him.

The boar encroached into "Tawy and Ewyas" (some place in southeastern Wales) already having caused numerous casualties, so that Arthur mustered the troops at the mouth of the Severn (Welsh: Aber Hafren), and ordered the Cornish and Devon men to halt the boar there. (Note: And prevent its entry into Cornwall.) The men ultimately failed this, though they did manage to wrest the razor, scissors, and later the comb from the boar while it waded in the Severn's water. However, when it touched its feet on the riverbed, the beast bolted away and could not be stopped till it reached Cornwall, where the boar was finally driven offshore, and it is not known where it went, still being chased by the dogs Aned and Aethlem: thus the tale leaves the possibility of the boar's survival and eventual return.

Yet another boar, Ysgithyrwyn or "White-Tusk, Chief of Boars", had to be captured for its tusk to complete the grooming of Ysbadadden.

== Etymology and Irish cognate ==
As previously noted, the Welsh word twrch means "wild boar, hog, mole", so Twrch Trwyth means "the boar Trwyth". Its Irish cognate may be Triath, King of the Swine (Old Irish: Triath ri torcraide) or the Torc Triath mentioned in Lebor Gabála Érenn, also recorded as Old Irish Orc tréith "Triath's boar" in Sanas Cormaic; John Rhys was conducive to the idea that these Old Irish words or names had been borrowed by Welsh literature and recorded as Trwyth or Trwyd.

However, Rachel Bromwich took a position contrary to Rhys, and was sceptical that there should be any reason to conclude there had to be any mutual borrowing between the Irish and the Welsh regarding the boar names.

Bromwich regards the form Trwyth as a later scribal corruption and asserts trwyd to be the "original form"; also, the misreading of -d with -t in Welsh Trwyd, together with vowel shifts by copyist led to the Latinised forms Troynt or Troit. Further evidence that Trwyd was the original correct form is found in the aforementioned reference in the Gwarchan Cynfelyn and later poetry. (Note: Bromwich's early examples is Gwarchan Cynfelyn : "Gweilging torch trychdrwyt / trychinfwrch trychethin" (italics hers) shows a "-t" ending. The next example is Cynddelw: "Keffitor ymdwr am drwyd hevelyt/ Twrch teryt y ar uwyd". The third is Gruffudd ap Maredudd: "milwr torch trin mal aerdwrch trwyt". Fourth is Iolo Goch, Syr Hywel y Fwyal: "A gŵr gwynllwyd, Twrch Trwyd trin,/ Nawswyllt yn rhoi farneiswin".)

== French analogues ==
It has been suggested that Trwyth the boar has been remoulded as a human character or reconfigured into another boar in French romances.

The Knight of the Round Table named "Tor son of Ares" who appears in Chrétien de Troyes's romance Erec et Enide may have been reinvented out of "Twrch son of Tared" in Culhwch ac Olwen, an idea advanced by Idris Llewelyn Foster Some scholars venture that the authentic patronym in the original lore gave the father's name as closer to "Ares".

Another suggestion is that Trwyth was recast as a different in the story of Caradoc (another Knight of the Round) in the so-called Livre de Caradoc of the First Peceval Continuation. Here, Cardoc is angered to discover he was in fact illegitimate, a product of cuckoldry, and punishes the wizard who was his biological father by forcing him to mate with a mare, a greyhound, and a sow, each producing an offspring that became Cardoc's brothers. Cardoc's sibling boar, named Tortain, was perhaps a rehash of the Welsh boar Trwyth, according to Gaston Paris.

== Popular culture ==
- Twrch Trwyth is the name of a Welsh traditional dance group based in Clwb Ifor Bach, Cardiff.
- Y Twrch Trwyth is also the mascot of Ysgol Dyffryn Aman (formally Amman Valley Comprehensive School and Amman Valley Grammar School) in Ammanford, Carmarthenshire, South West Wales.
- In the 2016 summer event of the mobile game Fate/Grand Order, Twrch Trwyth is the final boss.

== See also ==
- Henwen, a sow from Cornwall that made a run from the south end to the north tip of Wales, and bore Cath Palug
- Ysgithyrwyn Chief Boar (Ysgithrwyn Pen Beidd, Yskithyrwynn Pennbeidd, "White-tusk chief of Boars")
