= Culhwch and Olwen =

Welsh tale

Culhwch ac Olwen
- "Culhwch and Olwen"
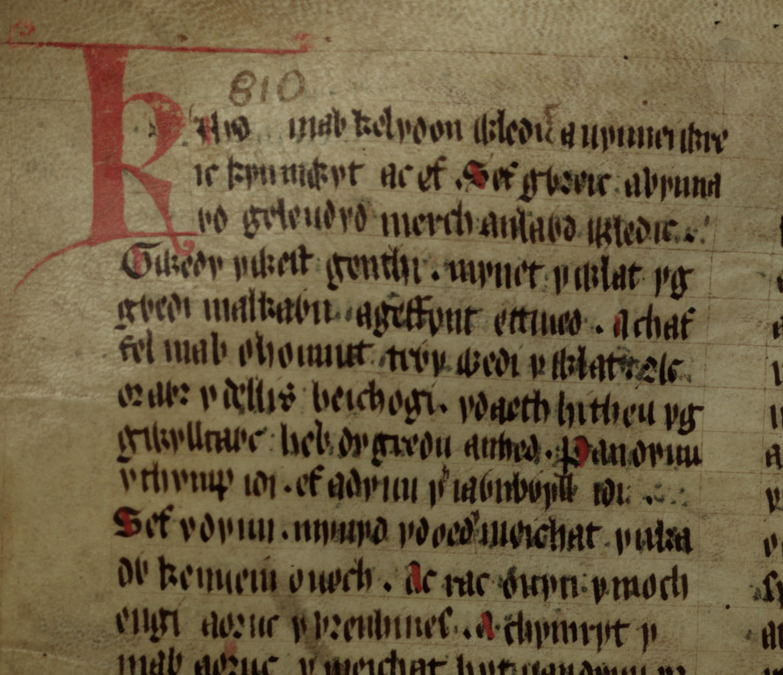
- The opening lines of Culhwch and Olwen, from the Red Book of Hergest; Kilydd mab Kelydon Wledig a fynnei wraig kyn mwyt ac ef. Sef gwraig a vynna oedd Goleudyd merch Anlawd Wledig.
- Author(s): Anonymous
- Language: Middle Welsh
- Date: c. 11th–12th century
- Series: The Mabinogion
- Manuscript(s): White Book of Rhydderch; Red Book of Hergest
- Verse form: Prose
- Text: Culhwch ac Olwen at Wikisource

Culhwch and Olwen (Welsh: Culhwch ac Olwen) is a medieval Welsh tale in which Culhwch, aided by his cousin King Arthur and his warriors, seeks to marry Olwen, daughter of the giant Ysbaddaden Pencawr. It survives in only two manuscripts: a complete version in the Red Book of Hergest, c. 1400, and a fragmentary version in the White Book of Rhydderch, c. 1325. It is the longest of the extant Welsh prose tales, and was included by Lady Charlotte Guest in her collection The Mabinogion.

The tale uses a bridal quest as a frame story for a series of adventures undertaken by Arthur and his companions, including the completion of numerous seemingly impossible tasks and the hunt for the boar Twrch Trwyth. It has been regarded as perhaps the earliest Arthurian tale and among the earliest extant works of Welsh prose, although its date of composition remains debated.

Culhwch and Olwen influenced later Welsh literature and has been adapted in poetry, theatre, and film.

== Synopsis ==
Culhwch's father, King Cilydd son of Celyddon, loses his wife Goleuddydd after a difficult childbirth. When he remarries, the young Culhwch rejects his stepmother's attempt to pair him with his new stepsister. Offended, the new queen puts a curse on him so that he can marry no one besides the beautiful Olwen, daughter of the giant Ysbaddaden Pencawr. Though he has never seen her, Culhwch becomes infatuated with her. However, his father warns him that he will never find her without the aid of his famous cousin Arthur. The young man immediately sets off to seek his kinsman, and subsequently finds him at his court in Celliwig in Cornwall.

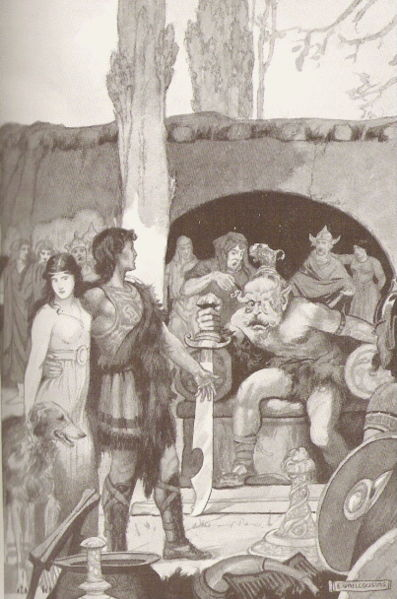
Culhwch at Ysbaddaden's court. An illustration by E. Wallcousins in Celtic Myth & Legend, Charles Squire, 1920 "Horses shall I have, and chivalry; and my Lord and kinsman Arthur will obtain for me all these things. And I shall gain thy daughter, and thou shalt lose thy life." "Go forward...and when thou hast compassed all these marvels, thou shalt have my daughter for thy wife."

Arthur agrees to lend help in whatever capacity Culhwch asks, save the lending of his sword Caledfwlch and other named armaments, or his wife. (Note: Arthur's other arms being his spear Rhongomyniad, his shield Wynebgwrthucher, and his dagger Carnwennan.) He sends not only six of his finest warriors (Cai, Bedwyr, Gwalchmei, Gwrhyr Gwalstawd Ieithoedd, Menw son of Tairgwaedd, and Cynddylig Gyfarwydd), but a long list of others with diverse skills (including Gwynn ap Nudd) is recruited to join Culhwch in his search for Olwen. The group meets several relatives of Culhwch's who know Olwen and agree to arrange a meeting. Olwen is receptive to Culhwch's attraction, but she cannot marry him unless her father Ysbaddaden agrees. However, he knows that he is fated to not live past his daughter's wedding, and so will not consent until Culhwch completes a series of about forty tasks. These tasks appear impossible, and include winning the basket/hamper of Gwyddneu Garanhir, (Note: Which is one of the Thirteen Hallows of Britain.) rescuing Mabon from his prison, and participating in the hunt of Twrch Trwyth and Ysgithyrwyn. However, only a few of the tales of successfully completing these tasks is recorded. In the end, the giant is killed, leaving Olwen free to marry her lover.

== Scholarship ==
The prevailing view among scholars was that the present version of the text was composed by the 11th century, making it perhaps the earliest Arthurian tale and one of Wales' earliest extant prose texts, but a 2005 reassessment by linguist Simon Rodway dates it to the latter half of the 12th century. The title is a later invention and does not occur in early manuscripts.

The story is on one level a folktale, belonging to the bridal quest "the giant's daughter" tale type (more formally categorized as Six Go through the Whole World type, AT 513A). The accompanying motifs (the strange birth, the jealous stepmother, the hero falling in love with a stranger after hearing only her name, helpful animals, impossible tasks) reinforce this typing.

However, the bridal quest serves merely as a frame story for the rest of the events that form the in-story, where the title characters go largely unmentioned. The in-story is taken up by two long lists and the adventures of King Arthur and his men. One list is a roster of names, some two hundred of the greatest men, women, dogs, horses and swords in Arthur's kingdom recruited to aid Arthur's kinsman Culhwch in his bridal quest. (Note: More than two hundred fifty names, including two hundred thirty warriors.) The other is a list of "difficult tasks" or "marvels" (pl. Welsh: anoethau, anoetheu), set upon Culhwch as requirements for his marriage to be approved by the bride's father Ysbaddaden. Included in this list are names taken from Irish legend, hagiography, and sometimes actual history.

The fight against the terrible boar Twrch Trwyth certainly has antecedents in Celtic tradition, namely Arthur's boar-hunt with his hound Cafall, whose footprint is discussed in the Mirabilia appended to the Historia Brittonum. The description of Culhwch riding on his horse is frequently mentioned for its vividness, and features of the Welsh landscape are narrated in ways that are reminiscent of Irish onomastic narratives. As for the passage where Culhwch is received by his uncle, King Arthur, at Celliwig, this is one of the earliest instances in literature or oral tradition of Arthur's court being assigned a specific location and a valuable source of comparison with the court of Camelot or Caerleon as depicted in later Welsh, English, and continental Arthurian legends.

== Cultural influence ==
Culhwch's horse-ride passage is perhaps reused in the 16th-century prose "parody" Araith Wgon, as well as in 17th-century poetic adaptations of that work. The Tolkien scholar Tom Shippey has argued that there are similarities between The Tale of Beren and Lúthien, one of the main cycles of J. R. R. Tolkien's legendarium, and Culhwch and Olwen.

== Adaptations ==
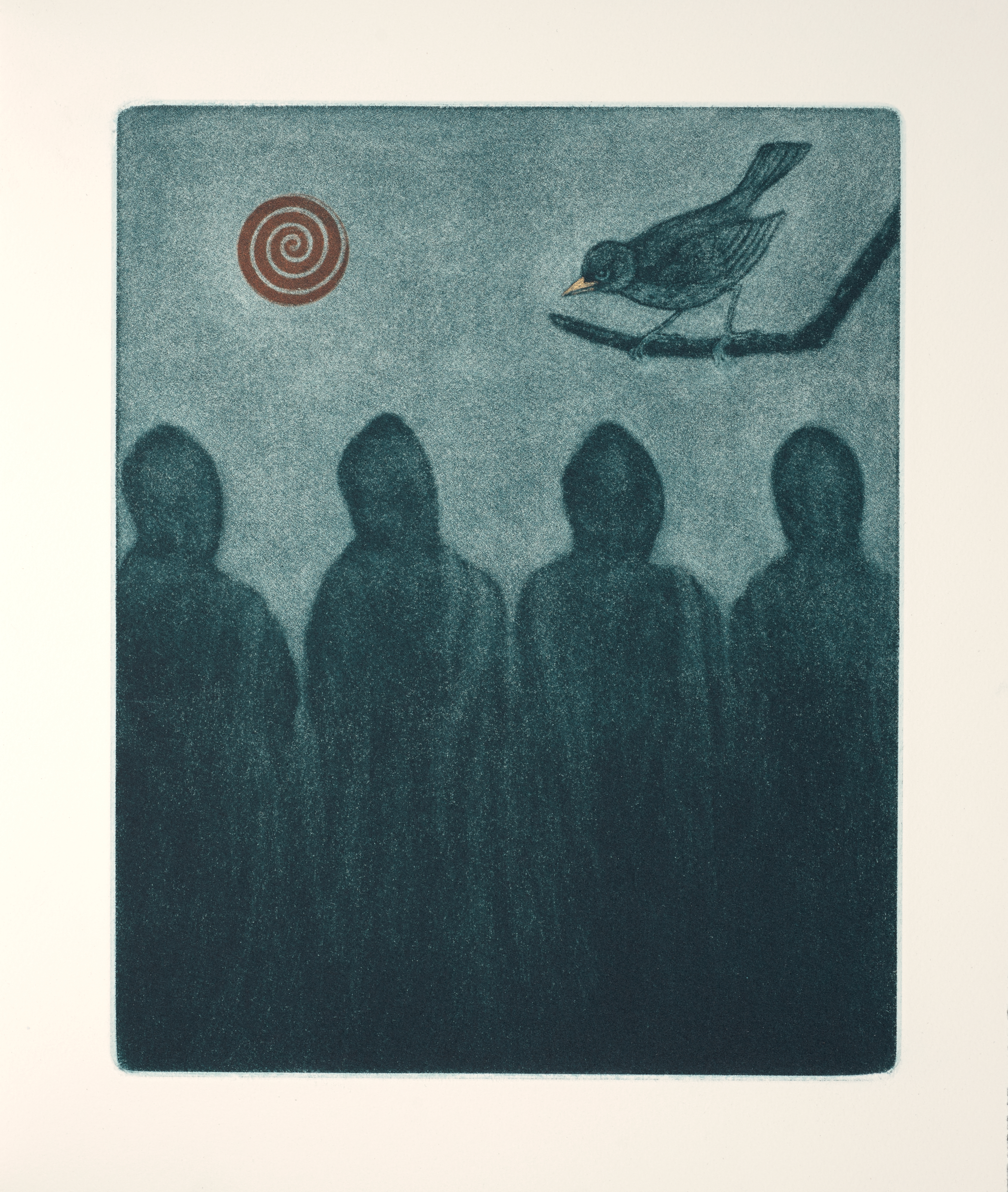
Questioning the Ouzel of Cilgwri in Culhwch and Olwen by Shirley Jones (2016)

- British painter/poet David Jones (1895–1974) wrote a poem called "The Hunt" based on the tale of Culwhch ac Olwen. A fragment of a larger work, "The Hunt" takes place during the pursuit of the boar Twrch Trwyth by Arthur and the various war-bands of Celtic Britain and France.
- In 1988, Gwyn Thomas released a retelling of the story, Culhwch ac Olwen, which was illustrated by Margaret Jones. Culhwch ac Olwen won the annual Tir na n-Og Award for Welsh language nonfiction in 1989.
- Soviet animated film Quest for Olwen, adapted from the legend, was released in 1990, directed by Valery Ugarov.
- A shadow play adaptation of Culhwch and Olwen toured schools in Ceredigion during 2003. The show was created by Jim Williams and was supported by Theatr Felinfach.
- The tale of Culhwch and Olwen was adapted by Derek Webb in Welsh and English as a dramatic recreation for the reopening of Narberth Castle in Pembrokeshire in 2005.
- The Ballad of Sir Dinadan (2003), the fifth book of Gerald Morris's The Squire's Tales series, features an adaptation of Culhwch's quest.
- The Quest (2016) is an artist's book by Shirley Jones focusing on the quest, which is to find the whereabouts of the prisoner, Mabon, son of Modron, in Culhwch and Olwen.

== See also ==
- Rhuawn Bebyr

== Sources ==
- Bromwich, Rachel; Evans, D. Simon (1992). Culhwch and Olwen: An Edition and Study of the Oldest Arthurian Tale. University of Wales Press. ISBN 0-7083-1127-X.
- Ford, Patrick K. (1977). "Culhwch and Olwen". The Mabinogi and Other Medieval Welsh Tales (2 ed.). Berkeley: University of California Press. ISBN 0-520-03414-7.

- —— (2019) [1977]. "Culhwch and Olwen". The Mabinogi and Other Medieval Welsh Tales (2 ed.). Berkeley: University of California Press. pp. 113–150. ISBN 978-0-520-30958-6.

- Guest, Charlotte (1849). "Killhwch and Olwen, or the Twrch Trwyth". The Mabinogion: from the Llyfr Coch o Hergest, and other ancient Welsh manuscripts. Vol. 2. London: Longman, Brown, Green, and Longmans. pp. 249–.
- Foster, Idris Llewelyn (1959). "Culhwch and Olwen and Rhonabwy's Dream". In Loomis, Roger S. (ed.). Arthurian Literature in the Middle Ages. Oxford: Clarendon Press. ISBN 0-19-811588-1.
- Gantz, Jeffrey (1976). "Culhwch and Olwen". The Mabinogion. Penguin. ISBN 0-14-044322-3.
- Jones, Gwyn; Jones, Thomas (1993) [1949]. "Culhwch and Olwen". The Mabinogion. Everyman Library. London: J. M. Dent. pp. 80–113. ISBN 0-460-87297-4.

- Jones, Gwyn (2011) [1949]. "Culhwch and Olwen". The Mabinogion. Read Books. ISBN 978-1446546253.

- Knight, Stephen; Wiesner-Hanks, Merry E. (1983). Arthurian Literature and Society. Springer Verlag. pp. 12–19. ISBN 1-349-17302-9.
- Koch, John T. (2014). "The Celtic Lands". In Lacy, Norris J. (ed.). Medieval Arthurian Literature: A Guide to Recent Research (revised ed.). Routledge. pp. 256–262. ISBN 978-1-317-65695-1.
- Loomis, Richard M. (2015). "Culhwch and Olwen". In Lacy, Norris J.; Wilhelm, James J. (eds.). The Romance of Arthur: An Anthology of Medieval Texts in Translation (3 ed.). Routledge. pp. 28–. ISBN 978-1-317-34184-0.
- Owen, Douglas David Roy (1968). The Evolution of the Grail Legend. Oxford: University Court of the University of St. Andrews. ISBN 9780050018361.
- Rodway, Simon (2019). "Culhwch ac Olwen". In Lloyd-Morgan, Ceridwen; Poppe, Erich (eds.). Arthur in the Celtic Languages: The Arthurian Legend in Celtic Literatures and Traditions. University of Wales Press. pp. 67–. ISBN 978-1-786-83344-0.
