= Olwen =

Giant's daughter in Welsh mythology

In Welsh mythology, Olwen (or Olwyn) is the daughter of the giant Ysbaddaden and cousin of Goreu. She is the heroine of the story Culhwch and Olwen in the Mabinogion. Her father is fated to die if she ever marries, so when Culhwch (sometimes spelled as Kilhwch) comes to court her, he is given a series of immensely difficult tasks which he must complete before he can win her hand. With the help of his cousin King Arthur, Culhwch succeeds and the giant dies, allowing Olwen to marry her suitor.

== Description ==
In the tale Culhwch and Olwen in the Mabinogion, she is described as a vision of beauty: wearing a flaming-red dress with a red-gold torc and many golden rings, she has "hair yellower than the broom", red (ruddy) cheeks, white skin and pale hands. She is also depicted as having the ability to spring white flowers from every step she takes.

== Other tales ==
The name "Olwen" reappears in the non-Arthurian folktale Einion and Olwen, about a sheep herder who travels to the Otherworld to marry Olwen; they later have a son named Taliesin. The tale was collected at the turn of the 19th century but is related to Culhwch and Olwen.

English author and publisher of the Mabinogion, Lady Charlotte Guest noted that Olwen became the object of later poetry by Dafydd ap Gwilym and Sion Brwynog. The latter begins a poem with the verse Olwen gulael lan galon ("Olwen of slender eyebrow, pure of heart").

== Etymology ==
The meaning of the name Olwen is "white footprint" or "white track". According to legend, she was so gentle and fragile that white trefoils would grow in her footprints. Some authorities consider her to have been originally a solar goddess, based on the etymology of her name and light-related attributes.

Professor John T. Koch states that "recent Welsh generally employs olwyn rather than rhod for 'wheel'."

== Notable persons with this name ==
- Olwen Brogan, British archaeologist
- Lady Olwen Carey Evans, DBE, daughter of British Prime Minister David Lloyd George
- Olwen Fouéré, Breton-Irish actress on stage and in film
- Dame Olwen Hufton, British historian of early modern Europe, women's history and social history
- Olwen Wymark, American playwright and author
- Olwen Davies, Headmistress of St Swithun's School and St. Mary's Hall, and sister of the conductor Meredith Davies
- British singer, actress Petula Clark born Petula Sally Olwen Clark.
- Olwen Burton, American physicist, scientist and published author.

== See also ==
- List of solar deities
