= Cyhyraeth =

Ghostly spirit in Welsh mythology

The cyhyraeth (Welsh pronunciation: [kəˈhəreθ]) is a ghostly spirit in Welsh mythology, a disembodied moaning voice that sounds before a person's death.

Legends associate the cyhyraeth with the area around the River Tywi in eastern Dyfed, as well as the coast of Glamorganshire. The noise is said to be "doleful and disagreeable", like the groans and sighs of someone deathly ill, and to sound three times (growing weaker and fainter each time) as a threefold warning before the person expires. Along the Glamorganshire coast, the cyhyraeth is said to be heard before a shipwreck, accompanied by a corpse-light.

Like the Irish banshee and the Scottish Cailleach, to which the cyhyraeth and the Gwrach y Rhibyn are closely related, the cyhyraeth also sounds for Welsh natives dying far from home.

== Etymology ==
The etymology of the term is unclear. The first element could be from Welsh cyhyr "muscle", "tendon", "flesh", but this is uncertain. An alternative possibility is that cyhyr is from cyoer, from oer "cold", with the last element being the noun aeth meaning "pain", "woe", "grief", "fear". Alternatively, the final element could simply be the nominal suffix -aeth (roughly equivalent to English -ness or -ity).

== Gwrach y Rhibyn ==
The legend of the cyhyraeth is sometimes conflated with tales of the Gwrach-y-Rhibyn (pronounced [ˈɡwrɑːx ə ˈr̩ibɨn]) or Hag of the Mist, a monstrous Welsh spirit in the shape of a hideously ugly woman – a Welsh saying, to describe a woman without good looks, goes, "Y mae mor salw â Gwrach y Rhibyn" (she is as ugly as the Gwrach y Rhibyn) – with a harpy-like appearance: unkempt hair and wizened, withered arms with leathery wings, long black teeth and pale corpse-like features. She approaches the window of the person about to die by night and calls their name, or travels invisibly beside them and utters her cry when they approach a stream or crossroads, and is sometimes depicted as washing her hands there. Most often the Gwrach y Rhibyn will wail and shriek "Fy ngŵr, fy ngŵr!" (My husband! My husband!) or "Fy mhlentyn, fy mhlentyn bach!" (My child! My little child!), though sometimes she will assume a male's voice and cry "Fy ngwraig! Fy ngwraig!" (My wife! My wife!).

If it is death that is coming, the name of the one doomed to die is supposed to be heard in her "shrill tenor". Often invisible, she can sometimes be seen at a crossroad or a stream when the mist rises.

Some speculation has been asserted that this apparition may have once been a water deity, or an aspect of the Welsh goddess Dôn. She is the wife of Afagddu, the despised son of Ceridwen and Tegid Foel, in some retellings of the Taliesin myth.
