= Tegid =

Tegid may refer to:

- Ioan Tegid (1792–1852), Welsh clergyman and bard
- Tegid Foel, a character in Welsh mythology
- Llyn Tegid, lake in Wales
