= Celtic Wolves =

Fantasy book series by Jan DeLima

- Celtic Moon; Summer Moon; Autumn Moon
- Author: Jan DeLima
- Country: United States
- Language: English
- Genre: Paranormal romance
- Publisher: Ace Books
- Published: 2013 - current
- Media type: Print, e-book
- No. of books: 3

Celtic Wolves is an ongoing paranormal romance series and the debut series of American author Jan DeLima. The first book in the series, Celtic Moon, was released in September 2013 through Ace Books.

As of September 2015 the series comprises three books, each of which takes place in the same universe but follows a different female protagonist. The second book in the series, Summer Moon, contains artwork created by DeLima.

== Synopsis ==
The series is set within a world where shifters exist, however new ones can only be created via childbirth. Shifters can transform into wolves, are very strong, can heal when they shift, and are capable of living extremely long lifespans, among other abilities - some of which are extremely powerful and desirable. They gained their powers via the goddess Ceridwen, who appointed a specific group of shifters known as the Guardians to watch over her son Taliesin, also known as "Sin". Over time the shifters' powers have grown weaker and weaker, to the point where several shifters are born without the ability to transform into wolves, but still retain the strength and lifespans of a regular shifter. The Guardians see these shifters are weak and endorse killing them, forcing many to flee and hide for their lives - something that also causes Sin to eschew the Guardians' protection. One group, located in Rhuddin Village and led by Dylan, has taken in these shifters - sparking a war between the Guardians and any group that the Guardians view as an enemy. To make matters more tense, the village also contains Dylan's sister Elen, who has strong healing and nature powers, which the Guardians want to take for their own. As the series progresses the Guardians also seek to attack the village because it contains unmated female shifters, women that have not yet found a true mate and are capable of giving birth to new shifters.

=== Celtic Moon ===
Celtic Moon focuses on Dylan's mate Sophie, who fled Rhuddin Village because she was mistreated by Dylan's fellow shifters and felt like she was being contained like a prisoner. She's forced to return after realizing her son is a shifter, which brings her face to face with the issues surrounding the Guardians and the village. By the book's end she has reunited with Dylan and has gained the ability to detect truth, a mythological weapon known as the "Serpent", and one of Sin's hounds, Tucker. The book introduces the strife between the factions and the characters of Rosa (the main character of book two) and Dylan's sister Elen, who is the focus of book three.

=== Summer Moon ===
Book two focuses on Rosa, the wife of Math, a Guardian that was killed at the close of Celtic Moon. Because she is the last unmated female shifter capable of transformation, Rosa is to be sent overseas to the remaining Guardians so they can force themselves upon her by way of an ancient fertility ritual. Unwilling to allow this to happen, Rosa escapes to Rhuddin Village, where she meets and falls in love with Dylan's brother Luc.

=== Autumn Moon ===
The third novel centers upon Elen. She has managed to free a fellow shifter and friend, Cormack, from being perpetually trapped as a wolf. As he has always been in love with her, Cormack wants to woo and win Elen's heart, but finds that he must first defeat one of the Guardians that is intent on claiming her - and her power - for himself.

== Books ==
1. Celtic Moon (September 2013)
2. Summer Moon (September 2014)
3. Autumn Moon (September 2015)

== Reception ==
Critical reception for the series has been mostly positive. USA Today gave a favorable review for Celtic Moon, which they felt was a "fun start to a new paranormal series." RT Book Reviews has written favorable reviews for the first three books in the series, and marked Summer Moon as a "top pick" and nominated it for their 2014 "Best Paranormal Romance" award.

In contrast, Publishers Weekly gave a mostly negative review for Summer Moon, writing that "DeLima’s ambition is admirable, but the romance is unfortunately buried and the resolution to the dramatic conflict is sudden and unrewarding."
