= The Knightly Tale of Gologras and Gawain =

Arthurian romance

The Knightly Tale of Gologras and Gawain (also commonly spelt Golagros and Gawane) is a Middle Scots Arthurian romance written in alliterative verse of 1362 lines, known solely from a printed edition of 1508 in the possession of the National Library of Scotland. No manuscript copy of this lively and exciting tale has survived.

Though the story is set during Arthur and his band's journey of pilgrimage to the Holy Land, most of the action takes place in France, with Sir Gawain, King Arthur's nephew as its main hero. The tale actually contains two episodes borrowed from the First Continuation to Chrétien de Troyes's Perceval, the Story of the Grail.

In the first episode, which ostensibly occurs in France somewhere west of the Rhone River, Sir Gawain succeeds in obtaining provisions merely by graciously asking, rather than by confiscating the supplies by brute force as Sir Kay tries to do. In the second, far longer, episode, Arthur and his men come to a castle on the Rhone, and learn that its lord (named Gologras), pledges allegiance to no higher sovereign. Aghast at the thought, Arthur returns to the castle after completing his pilgrimage, and besieges it. The bitter conflict is decided by single-combat between Sir Gawain and Gologras.

The tale upholds the longstanding Arthurian tradition that Sir Gawain represents the paragon of chivalry, and his characteristic fairness makes him gain more for King Arthur than will violence alone. In the Gologras episode, Gawain's soft-spoken words alone fail to achieve results, but Gawain prevails by in combat where the others have failed. And even there, it is the combination of both "knightly honor and prowess" that stamps the hallmark of Gawain's chivalry: for Gawain, ever the gracious victor, agrees to participate in a charade pretending to be the vanquished loser, in order to save face for his adversary Gologras. Striking friendship with such dreaded foe is reminiscent of Sir Gawain and the Green Knight.

== Texts ==
=== Dating and authorship ===
No manuscript copy survives, and the work is known solely through The Knightly Tale of Golagrus and Gawane, a blackletter printed book issued in Edinburgh by the Chepman and Myllar Press (1508). This year was the advent of the very first books being printed in Scotland, by the aforementioned press (Walter Chepman and Androw Myllar, proprietors).

Modern commentators do not identify an author, and date the composition to "not long before" this printing, i.e., the late 15th century. However, Frederic Madden in his edition (1839) ascribed the work to the poet of The Awntyrs off Arthure (whereas modern commentators do not venture farther than to remark on the identical stanzaic structure). Madden also gave credence to the notion that Awyntyrs (and by extension Gologras too) were the work of one "Clerk of Tranent", acting on the hint in a line of William Dunbar's poetry. Accordingly, Madden dated the composition to the first half of the 15th century, coincident with the activity of the "Clerk". Another name also crops up as a speculated author of the two metrical romances, namely Huchown, mentioned in passing in Andrew of Wyntoun's poem.

=== Printed editions ===
Of the 1508 printed book, only one copy is known, preserved at the National Library of Scotland. It is bound together with other "tracts" of the period, 11 in all, comprising a single volume referred to as the Chepman and Myllar prints. The present work is the second tract, occupying pages 7–48. The volume was once owned by the Advocates Library, with shelfmark H.30.a.

The text resurfaced in J. Pinkerton, Scotish [sic] poems, volume III, (1792), but "negligently reprinted" according to Madden. A facsimile edition was published by David Laing (1827), though this was not a literal replica but a proofed and corrected version. This 1827 facsimile was the base text later employed by Madden in his edition of the work, included in the anthology Syr Gawaine.

Golagros and Gawane is the spelling employed by many past commentators. But Hahn's edition substituted "Gologras" in the title, because that was the most frequently occurring in the text.

== Plot ==
=== Geographical identifications ===
(lines 1~26; 302, 310, etc.)

Arthur and his band are on a pilgrimaging voyage back and forth from the Holy Land (Jerusalem). Neither "Holy Land" nor "Jerusalem" is mentioned explicitly, and the line "Seeking Him over the sea who was sackless [innocent] but sold (by Judas).." implies going to Jerusalem, the site of the Holy Sepulchre, tomb of Christ. (ll. 1-4)

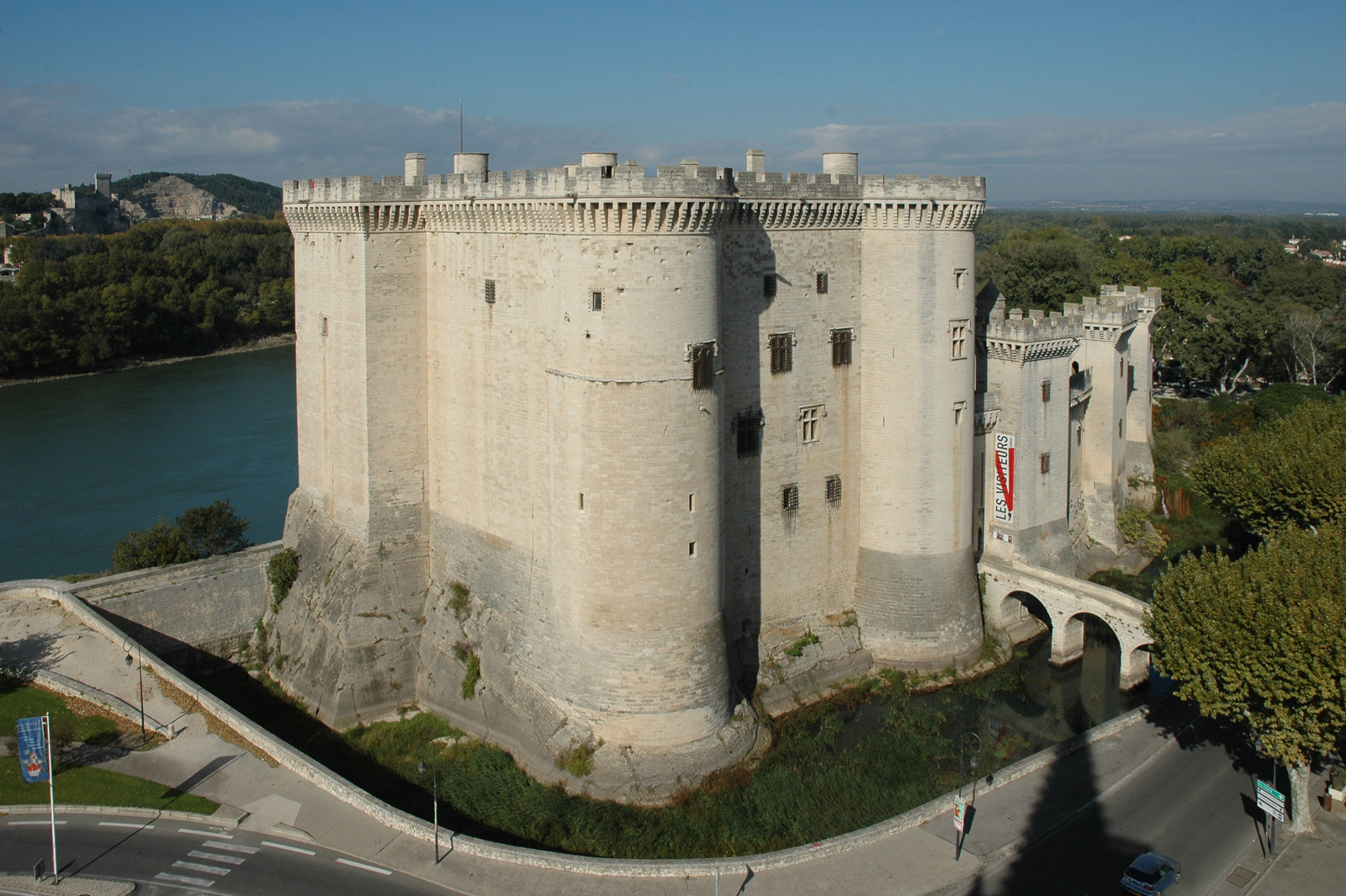
A medieval castle on the river Rhône in southern France

The opening lines mention they are heading towards Tuscany, but the two major episodes take place somewhere in France. The city where Arthur replenishes provisions is of uncertain location, but presumably somewhere still to the west of the Rhône. Golagros's castle is in the Rhône valley (somewhat confusing since on the first instance (line 319) the original print reads "Rome,") but this is to be emended as "Rone," as occurs elsewhere. Arthur vows to subjugate Golagros's castle on his way to the Holy Land, but only puts this into action after reaching Jerusalem, retracing his route back to the Rhône.

=== The city of provisions ===
(Lines 27~221)

Approaching a certain city, Arthur's large band starts running out of victuals, and Sir Kay is sent inside to buy food and provisions. The hall is deserted, but in an adjoining kitchen is a dwarf roasting a fowl, and Kay is so hungry he grabs the meat. The lord of the castle appears and rebukes him, but Kay answers defiantly, earning a thrashing. (ll. 40-118) King Arthur now sends Sir Gawain to bargain with its lord. Sir Gawain courteously entreats the lord of the castle to furnish supplies at whatever price he asks. The lord says he cannot comply, but all he meant was he cannot possibly accept payment, because that would bring him insufferable shame, deserving of being drawn by a horse). The city's lord promises to furnish Arthur with an army of 30,000 whenever in need. Arthur's band is given a feast that lasts for four days, and is supplied with wine and wastell bread aplenty. (ll. 119-221)

=== Castle of Gologras ===
(Lines 222~1362)

After many more weary days of travel, King Arthur reaches a magnificent castle on the river Rhône, in southern France. The castle boasted thirty-three towers in its edifice. Moored alongside are forty sea-going vessels bound for distant corners of the world and King Arthur asks who is the overlord of this wonderful place. On being told by the knowledgeable Sir Spynagrose that its lord owes allegiance to nobody, Arthur is horrified and vows to make the lord (Golagros) submit to him upon his return.

King Arthur reaches the Holy Land, and returns to Gologras's castle on the Rhône. Arthur and his retinue camp before the castle, pitching pavilion type tents, planning their strategy, with the possibility of laying a siege in case negotiations break down. Arthur sends out three knights as emissaries, Gawain, Lancelot, and Ewane (Ywain). But Gologras refuses to pay homage to Arthur as liege-lord. The emissaries return to Arthur, and they begin preparations for a siege. Cannonballs (pellokis, sing. pellok) were loaded into gaping brass cannons (gapand gunnys of brase), and there were sharpened darts (ganyeis, sing. ganye), making huge noise. Trees were felled, and hurdles put up.

Inside the castle, Gologras's army too were preparing, wearing their greaves on their shins and garatouris (sing. garitour) on their knees. At a glance there were 140 shields in row, with a sturdy helmet and lance upon each shield. Each knight's heraldic device was on display, with the inscribed name clearly visible. Then a great sound of the trumpet was heard from the castle, and the man who blew it strutted towards a tower, fully armed, flashing sunlight in his direction from his shield and brandishing his spear. King Arthur asked the meaning of this, and Sir Spinogras explained it was a challenge to single combat.

King Arthur chooses Gaudifeir (Note: According to Bruce 1999, this knight of Arthur's appears only in this work) to face off against Galiot. (Note: Hahn 1995, note to line 557. In Lancelot of the Laik 302 there is a knight by this name who can be equated with Malory's Galehaut, but he cannot possibly be Galiot here.) Gaudifeir rode a berry-brown or a bay horse, and the other a blanchard or a white horse. (Note: From the original text, it is not quite clear which knight mounted which colored horse, owing to a lacuna occurring after line 550 (Hahn 1995, note to line 550). However, the modern prose version in Hall 1976, p. 93 reads: "Sir Gaudifeir went and prepared for battle. He chose all his war gear, careful to be sure he lacked nothing. His horse was berry brown..") Gaudifeir triumphs, and Galiot is taken to Arthur's stronghold. The following day, Gologras sends out Sir Rigal of Rone, and King Arthur counters with Sir Rannald. After a long and hard battle, the two knights kill one another, and are buried. Gologras then sends out four knights, Louis, Edmond, Bantellas, and Sanguel/Sangwell, who are matched against Sir Lionel, Ywain, Bedivere, and Gyromalance, respectively. (Note: As for Gyromance, Bruce 1999 identifies two knights with a similar name (Guiromelant). One of them appears in the Vulgate Esoire de Merlin as an underling of Amant, and he declared he would neve serve Arthur; Hahn sees pointed irony in this.) Following this battle in which honours are even, Gologras sends out five knights, Agalus, Ewmond, Mychin, Meligor, and Hew. From the Round Table appeared four knights, Cador of Cornwall, Owales, Iwell, and Myreot (and possibly a fifth knight named Emell. (Note: The text reads "emell" (uncapitalized). Hahn notes that Amours 1897 edition "is inclined to capitalize Emell as a proper name, making the fifth champion of the Round Table, though Hahn does not favor this emendation)) Arthur's side lose Owales and Iwell as prisoners, but capture Agalus and Hew, so the honours at the end of it all, remain even.

At this point Golgros's eyes flare in anger, and he declares "I sal bargane abyde, and ane end bryng;" (I shall take up the combat, and make and end of it). Two small bells are rung in the castle's belfry. Arthur inquires its meaning, and again Spynagrose explains that the bells were an announcement that the castle lord Gologras himself was now entering the combat in person. It was Arthur's nephew Sir Gawain who insists upon taking up this challenge on the king's behalf. Spynagrose is fearful of Gawain's safety and survival, and offers him specific tips in combat, such as to sustain consecutive blows with the shield no matter what happens, and to strike back when the adversary finally lets up, being out of breath. Meanwhile, Sir Kay who is not assigned an opponent challenges a man on a brown steed and prevails.

At last Gologras appears. He wore armor adorned with red gold and rubies and many heirlooms, and silken fringes. He was mounted on a white-complexioned horse (or a horse with a white forehead (Note: "ble quhite" (895). ble=Colour; complexion (Dict. Scots Language) but Hahn construes ble here as "forehead".)) studded with gold and beryl. Gologras was tall, standing half a foot higher than any other. This single-combat between Gologras and Sir Gawain is long and very evenly fought, but at last Sir Gawain gains the upper hand, when Gologras loses his footing on a slope (bra), and Sir Gawain is able to draw his dagger and hold it to his adversary's throat. But Gologras will not ask for mercy. He prefers death to the dishonour of surrendering to Sir Gawain. The victorious knight tries to persuade the other to capitulate and Gologras replies that if Sir Gawain will pretend to have been defeated and to walk off the field as his prisoner, then he will see that matters are resolved to Sir Gawain's liking once he is in his castle. Despite not knowing Gologras at all, Sir Gawain agrees to this plan, sensing that his adversary is honourable. They pick themselves up from the ground, pretend to fight for a while (a myle way, the time it takes to walk a mile, or about twenty minutes or half an hour), then Gologras leads Sir Gawain off the field as his prisoner. Roles have been reversed. King Arthur groans in anguish and begins to weep.

There is great joy inside the castle, and the board (meal tables) are set. Gawain too is offered a seat next to the dais (the medieval meal table). Gologras bangs the table with a heavy wand to command attention, and addresses his noblemen who rule the baronies and towns. He asks for their honest opinion on the following: Would they prefer that he were defeated on the field and captured, or be killed so that another lord may replace him to rule over them. The nobles are distressed, because they begin to understand what truly happened. They reply that they would rather have Gologras as their lord to the end of his days.

Gologras and Sir Gawain issue from the castle together, unarmed, and Gologras approaches King Arthur in submission, agreeing to have all his land held in fiefdom from the king. A whole weeks feasting ensues in celebration, and at the end of nine days, as King Arthur prepares to leave, he relinquishes his sovereignty of the land and gives full control back to Gologras.

== Literary analysis ==
=== Dialect ===
Gologras is written in Middle Scots, a dialect closely related to the northern variants of Middle English. It was written in the Anglo-Scottish border country, a region that produced many other poems such as Sir Gawain and the Green Knight and Awntyrs off Arthure. The vocabulary is very similar to that in those poems, and like them heavy use is made of alliteration.

=== Poetic style ===
The Knightly Tale of Gologras and Gawain is written in stanzas of thirteen lines each, rhyming ABABABABCDDDC. Like another Middle English poem, Sir Gawain and the Green Knight, most of the lines of each stanza are alliterative long lines; and like this earlier and more famous Arthurian poem recounting an adventure of Sir Gawain, it has a tail of four short lines at the end of every stanza. In the case of The Knightly Tale of Gologras and Gawain, however – unlike its more famous cousin – the last four lines of every stanza form a "separate quatrain... linked by final rhyme to the ninth line", a style of alliteration and rhyme that is identical to that found in the Middle English poem The Awntyrs off Arthure Perhaps this challenging rhyme scheme, coupled with the poem's use of a large number of technical terms for combat and costume, a Scots dialect and general unavailability of the text, has contributed to its relative, although undeserved, neglect.

=== The First Perceval Continuation parallels ===
As stated, The Knightly Tale of Gologras and Gawain is considered a pastiche of materials taken from the First Perceval Continuation, though the character name Gologras is unique, and the Holy pilgrimage setting do not parallel the French romance. (As an aside, the First Perceval continuation provided the source for another surviving English-language poem, The Jeaste of Sir Gawain, which likewise depicts King Arthur's nephew Sir Gawain engaging in single combat.) The parallel episodes in the First Perceval Continuation has been summarized by Madden in extenso, though with the caveat that Madden used the 1530 printed prose version, and not the original verse romance. Sparser summaries in English are given by Bryant and by Roach. (Potvin ed. 16331-624, 18209-19446; (Note: Here, line numbering follows the Potvin edition, in which the First continuation start at line 10602. Roach's critical edition starts at line 1 for the base text, so the line-numbering shifts off. Bryant's English translation also start at line 1. (Chretien de Troyes & Bryant (tr.) 1982)) Bryant's summary; Madden's summary.)

The paralleling portions occur in Section IV "Castle Orgueillous" in Roach's edition of the First Continuation. Arthur proposes and adventure, which is to rescue Gifflet, who has been held prisoner at the Castle Orgueillous ("The Proud Castle"). However, before the main adventure, Arthur and his knights experience a side-quest quite similar to The City of Provisions portion of Gologras. Sir Kay sets out to find food for his wearied king, and barges in on a manor near the castle of the Lord of Meyloant/Meliolant. (Note: Meyolant (Chrétien de Troyes & Potvin (ed.) 1866, 16374). Meliolant in the prose version (Madden 1839)) He finds a dwarf roasting a peacock, and asks "Are there any persons about?" (as if a dwarf is not a human being). Ignored, Kay holds back his compulsion to kill the dwarf on the spot, and now says, in effect, that "Since such a lovely bird as this is a mismatch for a humnchbacked dwarf, I shall have it for dinner." The angered dwarf now tells him to leave or suffer the consequences. Kay hurls the dwarf to a pillar supporting the chimney, when the lord of the manor makes entrance. The lord asks what is going on, and Kay is characteristically rude. So the lord declares "It is not in the habit of my family to refuse food to anyone who asks," and he grabs the peacock (probably by its spit) and slugs Kay in the neck, leaving him with an indelible burn mark. Kay reports back to Arthur of his failure, and the courteous Gawain is sent. The lord of the manor (named Yder li biaus or "Yder the Fair") is impressed and gives Arthur and his men a cordial invitation to his manor. (Potvin ed. III, lines 16331-16624; 1530 prose print version, fol. 103b-105)

King Arthur and his knights with Sir Brandelis as their guide, arrive at the Proud Castle. (This of course corresponds to Golagros's castle in the English poem, and the knowledgeable Brandleis take on the role of Spynagrose.) When Arthur and his men arrive, loud bells are sounded at the castle, (Note: Madden's summary says "horn", but the French text reads ".i. saint sonet" 18254; saint ="cloche". Cf. Van Daele dict. p.431 "saint1", Godefroy's dict. VII p. 365, "sein2") and knights from the neighboring lands gather, so that three thousand banners now flourish the castle. But no all-out siege warfare follows, and each army sends out a representative each day to joust in single-combat. Shortly after arriving, a number of single-combats take place. First Sir Lucan defeats one of the castle's knights, then he is himself defeated and taken prisoner. Bran de Lis is then victorious for King Arthur, Sir Kay loses his joust and, after an interval for a hunt, Sir Yvain is also victorious. The castle's lord, the "Riche Soldoier" [sic], then decides to fight. Sir Gawain rides against him.

The first day, Sir Lucan the butler is given the honor of jousting. He unhorses his opponent, and captured his horse, seemingly to gain victory. However, Brandelis explains that according to rules, victory hinged on him bringing back his opponent as captive, and had he done so, the castle would have surrendered and their adventure be over. Lucan goes back to the field and is met by a different opponent, and this time he is defeated and taken prisoner. The upside is that Lucan becomes inmates with Griflet, and is able to give him the news that Arthur was here to rescue him. The second day, Brandleis wins the joust. The third day, Kay fights a pitched battle, but loses for and infraction of an out of bounds rule. (The borders were marked by four olive trees). Kay tries to insist he won, but is laughed by his peers.

The jousting is interrupted by Saint Mary's feast, so Arthur and his men go hunting. Sir Gawain discovers a certain knight sitting by a tree. He does not respond to conversation, so Gawain tries to lift him up, and carry him back to Arthur. The knight tells him angrily to leave him alone, for he wishes to die. Gawain leaves the spot perplexed but soon gains an inkling of the circumstances when he encounters a maiden who happen to be the knight's betrothed. She was not able to make it in time to marry her knight on the wedding day, and she feared that would be the death of him. Gawain reassures her that her knight is alive. Gawain later learns from Brandelis that this knight turns out to be the ruler of the Proud Castle, named the Riche Soudoier, (Note: Bryant's translation gives "Riche Soldoier" and does not translate the name, but Van Daele's dict gave soudoïer -> soldoier "sm. soldat mercenaire, serviteur à gages", so the name means "Rich Mercenary". var, Rice Sodoier) and the lady was his amie.

The jousting resumes, and the fourth entrant Iwain also wins. The day after, the Riche Soudoier himself was announced to be the combant, so Sir Gawain volunteers to fight. In the end, Gawain is victorious and Arthur achieves the adventure (recovery of Sir Griflet). But just as in the English poem Gologras and Gawain, Gawain will pretend to have been defeated by his opponent, so in the meanwhile, Arthur and the others must worry about Gawain's well-being. In the English poem, Gawaine agrees to the charade merely to save his opponent's face. But in the First Perceval Continuation, the life of the Riche Sodoier's fiancee is at stake, because, he says, if the girl he loves knows that he has been defeated, she will die of grief.

=== Further parallels ===
Parallels can be found in medieval Arthurian literature, medieval romance and in Welsh mythology. In particular, the motif of reciprocity is widespread in early British literature.

==== Alliterative Morte Arthure ====
In the late-14th century Middle English poem known as the Alliterative Morte Arthure, based upon an episode in Geoffrey of Monmouth's mid-twelfth century Historia Regum Britanniae, King Arthur travels with an army across France in order to meet a Roman army sent against him. He encounters this army in France, defeats and kills its commander, sending the army back to Rome in disarray, along with the bodies of sixty of the chief senators of Rome, and reaches Tuscany (an area of Italy to the immediate south of the ancient region of Cisalpine Gaul) before news reaches him of Mordred's treachery, prompting an inauspicious and premature return.

The Knightly tale of Gologras and Gawain, also, has King Arthur fighting in France and leading an army towards Tuscany: "In the tyme of Arthur, as trew men me tald / The King turnit on ane tyde towart Tuskane, / Hym to seik ovr the sey, that saiklese was sald, / The syre that sendis all seill, suthly to sane." ("In the time of Arthur, as honest men have told me, the king set off one day for Tuscany, to seek Our Lord over the sea who was betrayed and died for us, our benevolent Father in all truthfulness.")

==== Sir Gawain and the Green Knight ====
In addition to the episodes described above, the First Continuation of Chrétien de Troyes' Perceval includes a scene in which a magician, who is the father of a knight of the Round Table, Sir Carados, enters King Arthur's court and invites one of the king's knights to cut off his head, promising that the knight can cut off his head afterwards. This is done, and a token blow received in return. The episode is very similar to one composed two hundred years later in Middle English alliterative verse, the opening scene of Sir Gawain and the Green Knight found in MS Cotton Nero A.x, and is possibly its direct source. In the story of Sir Gawain and the Green Knight, however, the return blow is to be delivered in exactly a year's time.

Sir Gawain, on his last night at Sir Bertilak's castle in Sir Gawain and the Green Knight, having gone through much to locate the Green Chapel at which he must suffer this return stroke of the axe, is determined, in truly chivalrous style, to be "merrier than ever before." Likewise, Gologras, in The Knightly Tale of Gologras and Gawain, is determined to be seen to be relaxed and "mery" in his hall, even when things are going badly for him outside and his knights are failing to gain the upper hand. This show of composure in adversity becomes a measure of honour and chivalry for both protagonists. And the climax of both The Knightly Tale of Gologras and Gawain and Sir Gawain and the Green Knight involves reciprocity. In the one, Sir Gawain takes upon himself what he has given to Gologras, that is, the mantle of defeat. In the other, Sir Gawain receives what he has given to his opponent, that is, a stroke of the axe. And not only a stroke of the axe, but earlier, also, in Bertilak's castle, a game was played in which everything that Bertilak had gained in the forest was given to Sir Gawain, and everything that Sir Gawain had achieved in the castle was (supposed to be) given to his host. More reciprocity.

==== Amis and Amiloun ====
A 14th-century Middle English poem Amis and Amiloun, found in the famous Auchinleck Manuscript, tells a story that contains many elements and motifs that are ultimately derived from European folklore. Based upon a 12th-century Old French poem Amis et Amiles, it tells of a pair of unrelated young men who are so alike that nobody can tell them apart. They swear blood brotherhood together, a pledge that is put to the test when Amis has to fight a trial by combat over a crime of which he is guilty. He rides to Amiloun, who by now is married, and they exchange identities. Amis rides back to Amiloun's castle pretending to be its lord. Amiloun rides away to fight the single combat on Amis's behalf, able to swear that he is innocent of the crime.

==== Mabinogion ====
Tales from the Middle Welsh Mabinogion are found in two manuscripts dating to the mid- and late-fourteenth century, but many of the tales themselves "evolved over a span of centuries: passed on from storyteller to storyteller, they were by turns expanded and distorted, improved and misunderstood." A mythological tale in the first of the Four Branches of the Mabinogi, one involving Annwvyn, not-world, or the Otherworld, tells of a hunting expedition undertaken by Pwyll Lord of Dyved. He sets his hounds against those of Arawn, the king of the Otherworld, and in an attempt to make amends, agrees to exchange places with this king for a year and a day in order to do battle with another king of the Otherworld, Havgan, in a year's time. So Arawn takes on the form of Pywll, Pwyll takes on the appearance of Arawn, and after spending a year in each other's lands, Pwyll (who looks like Arawn) does battle with Havgan, who must only be struck once, since if he is struck repeatedly, he will return the next day as fit and well as he ever was.
