= George Ellis (poet) =

English antiquary, satirical poet and Member of Parliament

- Born: 19 December 1753; Jamaica
- Died: 10 April 1815 (aged 61); Connaught Place, London

George Ellis FSA (19 December 1753 – 10 April 1815) was an English antiquary, satirical poet and Member of Parliament. He is best known for his Specimens of the Early English Poets and Specimens of Early English Metrical Romances, which played an influential part in acquainting the general reading public with Middle English poetry.

== Early life ==
George Rose Ellis was born in Jamaica on 19 December 1753, the posthumous son of a sugar-planter. His grandfather, also called George Ellis, was Chief Justice of Jamaica, and Edward Long, author of The History of Jamaica, was a maternal uncle.

He was brought to England in 1755, and according to the ODNB, educated at Westminster School and Trinity College, Cambridge.

He soon made a name for himself in Whig society as a young man of wit, charm and literary talent. Ellis published two volumes of light verse, Bath; Its Beauties and Amusements (1777) and Poetical Tales of Gregory Gander (1778), which gained great popularity not just in the English beau monde but even at Versailles, where Horace Walpole noted that Ellis was "a favourite". He went on to contribute to the anti-Pitt satirical work, The Rolliad (1784–85).

Ellis bought The Cedars, a prominent house in Sunninghill, Berkshire from the politician John Yorke.

== Sugar estates in Jamaica ==
When his father died in 1755, the slave estates of an infant George Ellis were run by his paternal uncle John Ellis. However, George would later complain to his maternal uncle, Edward Long, about John's avarice. George favoured leasing the Caymanas Park plantation, but John insisted "upon my keeping the Caymanas in my own hands". In the end, John won that battle of wills.

George received an income dependent on the plantation's output, which ranged from 40-80 hogsheads of sugar and 20-40 puncheons of rum. He travelled to Jamaica early in 1780, inspected his property there, contracted fever, and returned to England in late 1781. When his uncle John was lost at sea in 1782, George took control of his slave plantations in Jamaica, but did not pursue his original objective to lease Caymanas.

== Diplomatic and political career ==
In 1784, he was employed as an aide by his friend the Whig diplomat Sir James Harris (later Lord Malmesbury), with whom he travelled widely on the Continent. Taking advantage of his experience of diplomacy, he produced two prose works: Memoir of a Map of the Countries Comprehended between the Black Sea and the Caspian, published anonymously in 1788, but almost certainly by Ellis; and The History of the Dutch Revolution (1789), which had the unusual distinction of being translated into French by the future king Louis XVIII.

In 1793, Malmesbury turned Tory and entered Pitt's government, and Ellis followed him, becoming a close friend of the rising young politician George Canning. Ellis was elected in 1796 as an MP for both Westbury and Seaford, and chose to sit for Seaford. However, he is not known to have spoken in the House of Commons. In 1796 and 1797, he assisted Malmesbury in peace negotiations with France. On his return to England, he joined Canning and William Gifford in founding the Tory newspaper The Anti-Jacobin, and was a frequent contributor of satirical pieces to it.

In 1801 he married Anne (1773–26 August 1862), daughter of Admiral Sir Peter Parker, but they had no children. In the general election of the following year, he declined to stand, perhaps because of increasing ill-health, and he never again stood for Parliament.

== Literary scholarship ==
Ellis's first work of literary antiquarianism was his Specimens of the Early English Poets (1790). In its first edition this anthology only included lyric poems dating from the 16th and 17th centuries, in modern spelling, with historical and biographical notes. The second edition, published in 1801, was expanded from one volume to three, and extended the chronological range so as to include the Anglo-Saxon poem "The Battle of Brunanburh", "The Land of Cockayne" from 14th-century Ireland, substantial extracts from The Squire of Low Degree and Layamon's Brut, and other poems in Middle English and Middle Scots. It had a lengthy historical introduction, largely based on Thomas Warton's History of English Poetry and Thomas Tyrwhitt's edition of The Canterbury Tales, but written in a more lively and readable style. The Poets proved to be a popular work, going through six editions between 1790 and 1851, and on the strength of it Ellis was hailed in 1804 in the Critical Review as "the hope of poetic archaeology". His format was imitated by several writers connected with the Lake School. Robert Southey intended his Specimens of the Later English Poets, with Preliminary Notices (1807) as a sequel to Ellis's work, and it was followed by George Burnett's Specimens of English Prose-Writers, from the Earliest Times to the Close of the Seventeenth Century, with Sketches Biographical and Literary (1807), and Charles Lamb's Specimens of English Dramatic Poets, Who Lived about the Time of Shakespeare: With Notes (1808), all under the imprint of Ellis's publisher, Longman.

His second project, a collaboration with Gregory Lewis Way, was an edition of a number of 12th- and 13th-century French fabliaux, taken from the collection edited by Pierre Jean Baptiste Legrand d'Aussy. Ellis provided the preface, notes and appendix, Way the translations, and woodcuts were commissioned from Thomas Bewick and other engravers. Ellis's contribution was later praised in The Gentleman's Magazine as including "some of the purest and most classical passages of Addisonian composition which this age has produced". The two volumes of Fabliaux, or Tales were published in 1796 and 1800, and a three-volume edition, with corrections, appeared in 1815.

Ellis was a natural collaborator, but some of his ventures around this time did not reach completion. He worked on a glossary to accompany a proposed edition of the Middle English romance King Alisaunder by his friend Thomas Park, but Park eventually abandoned the idea. He also encouraged William Owen Pughe in his translation of the Mabinogion, began to learn Welsh, and proposed to write a preface. In the event, the translation only ever appeared incomplete in various periodicals, and no preface was called for. Ellis provided Joseph Ritson with a verse translation of the "Lament for the Death of Simon of Montfort", though this did not appear until after both their deaths, in Ritson's Ancient Songs and Ballads (1829); he also pulled strings to ensure Ritson's Ancient Engleish Metrical Romanceës (1802) was published.

He had better success in his Specimens of Early English Metrical Romances (1805), which presented a selection of Middle English romances, not in full editions but in the form of abstracts with numerous extracts. In this way he produced a work calculated to appeal to the reading public at large rather than to antiquarian specialists. Ellis included versions of eighteen Middle English romances, including the Stanzaic Morte Arthur, Guy of Warwick, Beves of Hamtoun, Sir Isumbras, Sir Eglamour of Artois and Amis and Amiloun, as well as eight of the Anglo-Norman Lais of Marie de France and the Latin Historia Regum Britanniae and Vita Merlini of Geoffrey of Monmouth. He arranged his romances by the cycle to which they belonged, and non-cyclical works by what he conceived to be the national origin of their subject-matter, thus anticipating the practice of many more recent literary historians. His texts were taken from inedited manuscripts and early prints, mostly provided for him by the bibliophile Francis Douce and by a new friend, the poet Walter Scott. Scott was preparing his own edition of the Middle English Sir Tristrem, and the two antiquaries exchanged a stream of enthusiastic letters, helping each other through the difficulties of their researches. Ellis explained to Scott his preference for readability over scholarly rigour thus:

A library is like a butcher's shop: it contains plenty of meat, but it is all raw; no person living ... can find a meal in it, till some good cook (suppose yourself) comes in and says, "Sir, I see by your looks that you are hungry; I know your taste – be patient for a moment, and you shall be satisfied that you have an excellent appetite."

Ellis's work was published in three volumes in 1805, with a second edition in 1811, and a third in 1848. James Orchard Halliwell later wrote that

It is, indeed, difficult to estimate too highly the services which Ellis rendered to literature by the publication of this work. The interminable ballad romances of the middle ages had daunted all but the few initiated; but then, as if by magic, they became the friends and companions of thousands. Ellis, in fact, did for ancient romance what Percy had previously accomplished for early poetry.

Scott reviewed the Romances favourably, commenting on their wit and elegance, and Ellis responded by praising The Lady of the Lake in the Quarterly Review, though he was more critical of The Lord of the Isles there. Scott wrote two cantos of Marmion at Ellis's home, The Cedars, at Sunninghill, on the edge of Windsor Great Park, and dedicated one of them to him, calling Ellis "My guide, my pattern, and my friend", and addressing him,

Thou, who can give to lightest lay,
An unpedantic moral gay,
Nor less the dullest theme bid flit,
On wings of unexpected wit;
In letters as in life approved,
Example honoured, and beloved

== Death and legacy ==
George Ellis died on 10 April 1815. George and his wife Anne did not have any surviving children, and his Jamaican sugar estates and slaves passed to his cousin Charles Ellis, 1st Baron Seaford, the son of his uncle John Ellis.

In his journal Scott ranked Ellis first among all the conversers he had ever known, but his undoubted social graces did not charm everyone. Robert Southey thought Ellis had "a little too much of the air of high life, a little too much of the conversationist ... and something in his manners which showed, or seemed to show, that it was a condescension in him to be a man of letters." The bibliographer Samuel Egerton Brydges' memories of him were of "an elegant versifier and writer, but not deep; he was a man of the world,– of very polished manners,– but a coxcomb and a petit maître". Ellis's epitaph, written by George Canning, includes these lines:

His Knowledge was various profound and accurate; and he imparted it without effort or ostentation. His Wit illuminated every object which it touched, but its brilliancy though powerful was unoffending. In the maturity of literary excellence he listened with the humility of a Learner, and amidst the severest studies he could relax in the playfulness of a Child.

== Notes ==
Parliament of Great Britain
Preceded by Edward Wilbraham-Bootle; Samuel Estwick	Member of Parliament for Westbury; 1796; With: Sir Henry St John-Mildmay, Bt	Succeeded by Sir Henry St John-Mildmay, Bt; George Harcourt
Preceded by John Tarleton; Richard Paul Jodrell	Member of Parliament for Seaford; 1796 – 1800; With: Charles Rose Ellis	Succeeded by Parliament of the United Kingdom
Parliament of the United Kingdom
Preceded by Parliament of Great Britain	Member of Parliament for Seaford; 1801 – 1802; With: Charles Rose Ellis	Succeeded by Sir Richard Sullivan; Charles Rose Ellis
