= John Yorke (1728–1801) =

British politician (1728–1801)

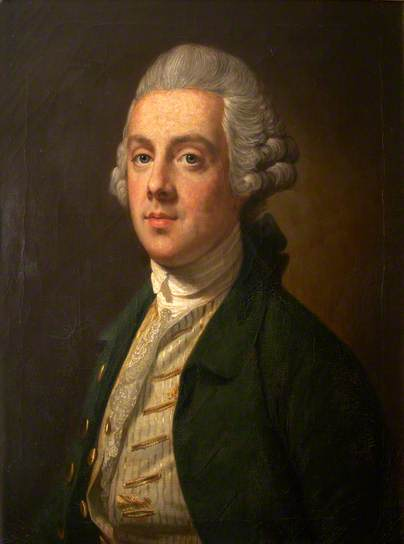

Member of the House of Commons for Higham Ferrers
- In office 1753–1768
- Preceded by: John Hill
- Succeeded by: Frederick Montagu

Member of the House of Commons for Reigate
- In office 1768–1784
- Preceded by: Charles Yorke
- Succeeded by: Edward Leeds

Personal details
- Born: 1728
- Died: 1801 (aged 72–73)
- Spouse: Elizabeth Lygon
- Children: Jemima Yorke Carew
- Parent(s): Philip Yorke, Margaret Cocks
- Education: Corpus Christi College

John Yorke (1728–1801) was an English barrister and politician who sat in the House of Commons from 1753 to 1784.

== Life ==
Yorke was the fourth son of Philip Yorke, 1st Earl of Hardwicke and his wife Margaret Cocks. Educated at Newcome's School, he matriculated at Corpus Christi College, Cambridge in 1746, graduating M.A. in 1749. Admitted to Lincoln's Inn in 1746, he was called to the bar in 1754.

Yorke held a number of legal sinecures, secured for him by his father as Lord Chancellor. In 1753 he was offered the parliamentary seat of Higham Ferrers, by Lord Rockingham, against his father's plans, and took it up. In practice he neglected the House of Commons, is not known to have spoken there, and lived much with his parents at Wimpole. He transferred in 1768 to the Reigate seat, which his brother Charles had given up, and retired as Member of Parliament in 1784.

Yorke owned The Cedars, a prominent house in Sunninghill, Berkshire. He sold the house to the antiquary George Ellis.

== Family ==
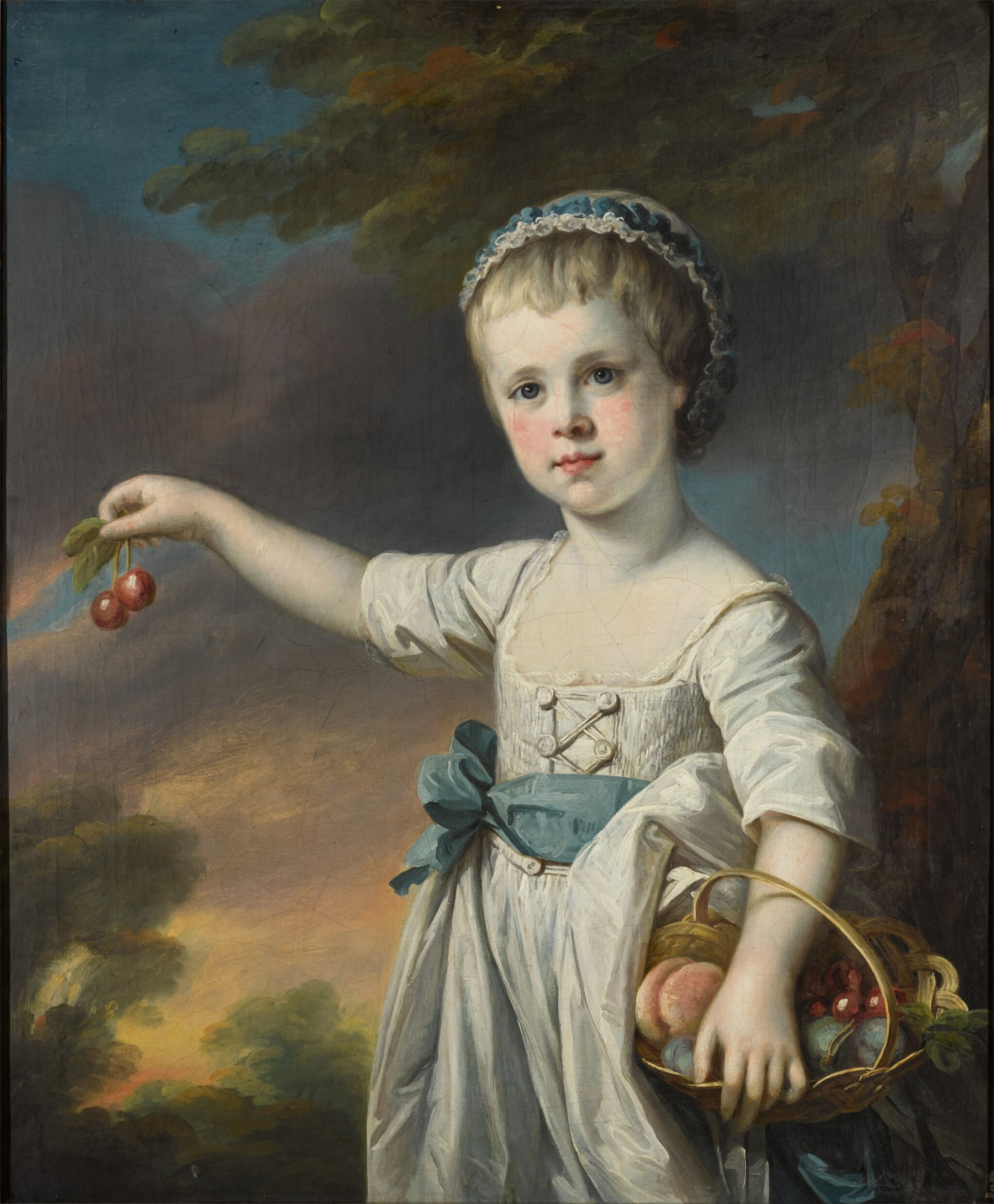
Portrait of Jemima Yorke (by Francis Cotes)

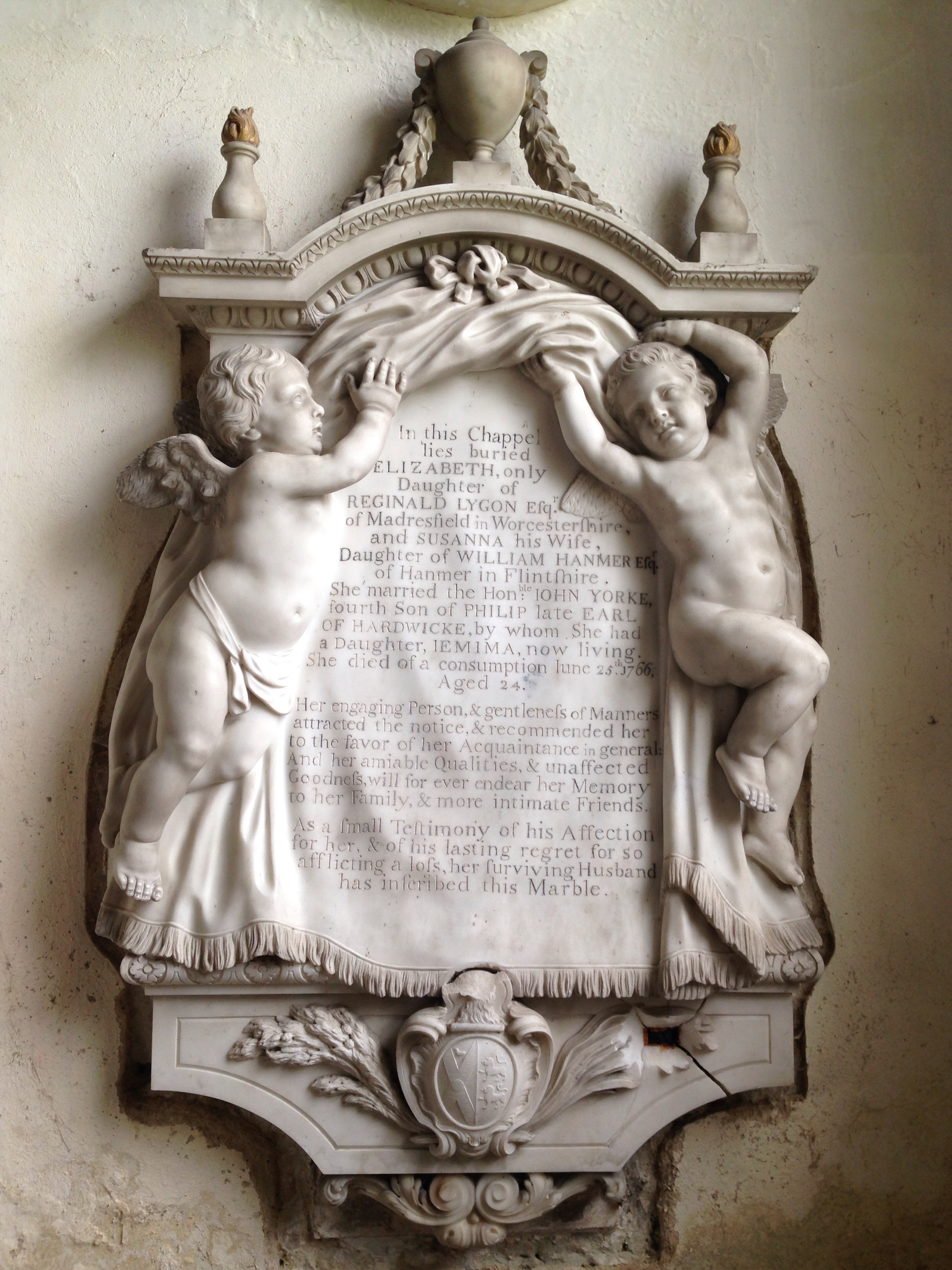
The memorial to Elizabeth Lygon at St Andrew's Church, Wimpole on the Wimpole Estate

Yorke married Elizabeth Lygon (b. 1742, d. 1766), the only daughter of Reginald Lygon of Madresfield. They had one daughter, Jemima Yorke (b. 1763, d. 16 Jul 1804), she married Reginald Pole Carew.

== Notes ==
Parliament of Great Britain
| Preceded by John Hill | Member of Parliament for Higham Ferrers; 1753 –1768 | Succeeded by Frederick Montagu |
| Preceded by Charles Cocks; Charles Yorke | Member of Parliament for Reigate; 1768–1784; With: Charles Cocks | Succeeded by William Bellingham; Edward Leeds |
