= Sunninghill, Berkshire =

Coordinates: 51°24′09″N 00°39′18″W

Sunninghill
- Village
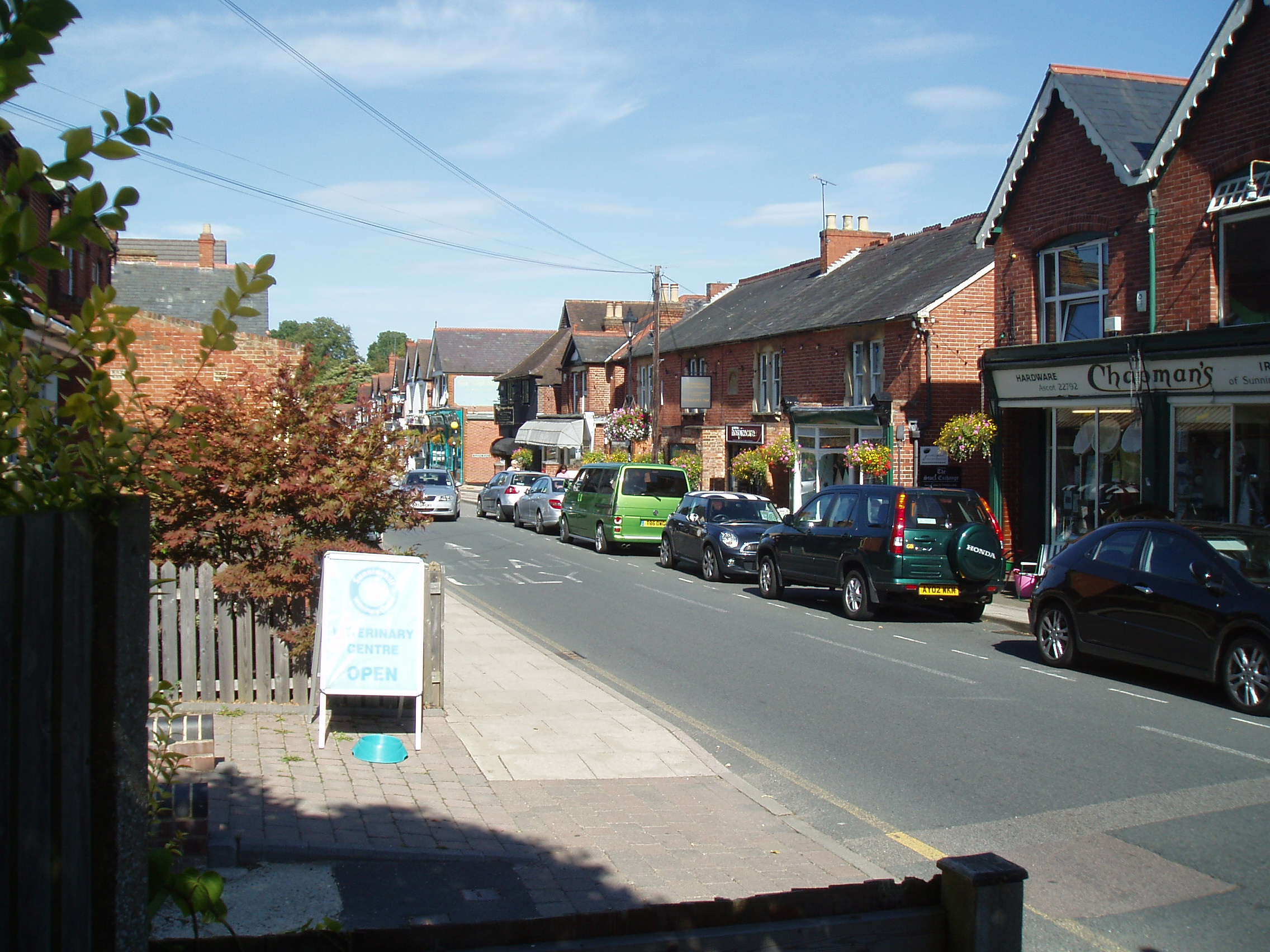
- Sunninghill High Street

- Location within Berkshire
- Population: 11,603 2001 Census (with Ascot)
- OS grid reference: SU937680
  - London: 23 miles (37 km)
- Unitary authority: Royal Borough of Windsor and Maidenhead
- Ceremonial county: Berkshire
- Region: South East
- Country: England
- Sovereign state: United Kingdom
- Post town: Ascot
- Postcode district: SL5
- Dialling code: 01344
- Police: Thames Valley
- Fire: Royal Berkshire
- Ambulance: South Central
- UK Parliament: Windsor

Sunninghill is a village in the civil parish of Sunninghill and Ascot in the Royal Borough of Windsor and Maidenhead in the English county of Berkshire.

== Location ==
It is south west and about 12 miles (19 km) from Heathrow Airport and 26 miles (42 km) from Central London. It is just outside Ascot, one of the UK's most famous locations for horse racing. It is close to Sunningdale, Windsor Great Park and Wentworth Golf Club. The town of Windsor is about 7 miles (11 km). Junction 3 of the M3 motorway and the A30 road are within 1 mile (2 km) at Lightwater. M25 London Orbital motorway junctions 13 at Staines and 11 at Chertsey are both 7 miles (11 km). The nearest railway stations are Ascot and Sunningdale on the London Waterloo to Reading line.

== Toponymy ==
The name Sunninghill means "the home of Sunna's people, that is, the Anglo-Saxon Sunningas tribe".

== History ==
The Church of England parish church of St Michael and All Angels was originally established about 890 but was rebuilt in 1808 and 1826–27. Cordes Hall in the centre of the village, was designed by Edward and Joseph Morris and built in 1902.

== Mansions ==
The area is mainly residential, characterised by generally large dwellings set in their own grounds.

=== Silwood Park ===
Silwood Park was first established as the manor house of Sunninghill by John de Sunninghill in 1362. The park is now a campus of Imperial College London, where CONSORT, a small nuclear reactor for civilian scientific research, was used from 1965 to 2012.

=== The Cedars ===
The Cedars sits opposite the church and is listed Grade II on the National Heritage List for England. It was the residence of the politician John Yorke in the 18th century; and the antiquary and poet George Ellis. The novelist Walter Scott stayed at The Cedars with Ellis and wrote part of his epic poem Marmion in the garden.

=== Tittenhurst Park ===
John Lennon and his second wife, Yoko Ono, lived at Tittenhurst Park, on London Road, from 1969 to 1971. Another member of The Beatles, Ringo Starr then lived there till the late 1980s. In the 19th century the house was also the home of Thomas Holloway the Victorian businessman and philanthropist together with his wife, Jane. Holloway was the founder of Royal Holloway, London University, in nearby Englefield Green, and also of Holloway Sanatorium in nearby Virginia Water. Jane died in 1875, aged 61; Holloway died there on 26 December 1875, aged 83. They are buried in a family grave at Sunninghill churchyard.

== Amenities ==
Sunninghill Saints Sports Club is a Saturday morning junior football and sports club for primary age children in the Ascot area.

Sunninghill is home to the amateur theatrical Quince Players.

== Sources ==
- Pevsner, Nikolaus (1966). The Buildings of England: Berkshire. Harmondsworth: Penguin Books. p. 233.
