= Battle of Camlann =

Legendary conflict

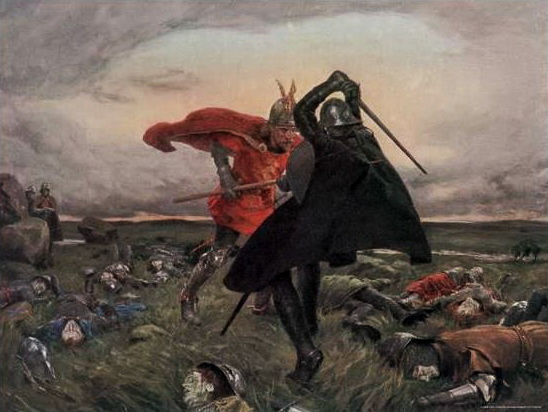
The Battle Between King Arthur and Sir Mordred, a 19th-century painting by William Hatherell

The Battle of Camlann (Welsh: Gwaith Camlan or Brwydr Camlan) is the legendary final battle of King Arthur, in which Arthur either died or was mortally wounded while fighting either alongside or against Mordred, who also perished. The battle's historicity is uncertain and disputed.

The original legend of Camlann, inspired by a purportedly historical event said to have taken place in early 6th-century Britain, is only vaguely described in several medieval Welsh texts dating from around the 10th century. The battle's much more detailed depictions have emerged since the 12th century, generally based on that of a catastrophic conflict described in the pseudo-chronicle Historia Regum Britanniae. The further greatly embellished variants originate from the later French chivalric romance tradition, in which it became known as the Battle of Salisbury, and include the 15th-century telling in Le Morte d'Arthur that remains popular today.

== Etymology ==
The name may derive from a Brittonic from *Cambo-glanna ("crooked/twisting bank (of a river)") or less likely *Cambo-landa ("crooked/twisting-enclosure" or "crooked/twisting open land"). The name of the Roman fort of Camboglanna (Castlesteads) in Cumbria shows it was in use but is probably not the site.

== Historicity ==
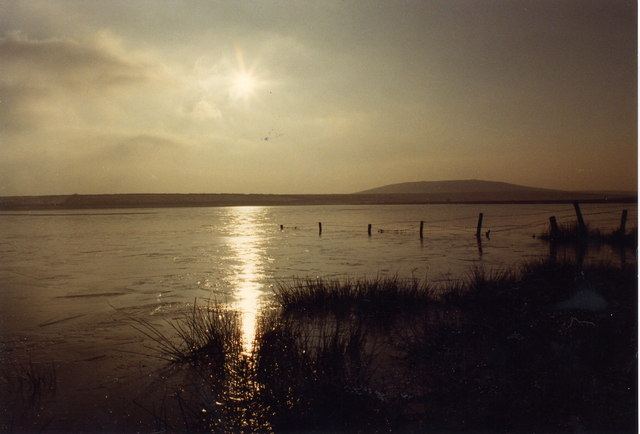
Dozmary Pool, a lake in Cornwall associated with the legend of Excalibur due to its proximity to Slaughterbridge, a potential location of the Battle of Camlann

The earliest dateable reference to the battle is found in the 10th-century Welsh annals Annales Cambriae. An entry for the year 537 mentions the "strife of Camlann, in which Arthur and Medraut fell, and there was great mortality in Britain and Ireland." (Note: The battle is dated 539 in some editions.) This is also the first written mention of Medraut (the later Mordred), but it does not specify whether he and Arthur fought on the same side or who won the battle.

Andrew Breeze (2020) argues that the battle is historical, and that it was an aftermath of the famine associated by the documented extreme weather events of 535–536, which caused, in the words of the Annales Cambriae, "great mortality in Britain and Ireland". He interprets Camlann as a cattle raid on central Britain; Breeze cites R. G. Collingwood, to the effect that an identification of Camlann with "Camboglanna on Hadrian's Wall" was "convincing". Discussing further indications suggesting Camlann as Castlesteads, near Carlisle, Breeze concludes: "There is every reason to think that, in 537, when the walls of this stronghold stood high [...], Arthur was killed [there] by men of Rheged, the British kingdom centred on Penrith." Flint Johnson disagrees with Breeze's interpretation of Camlann as a cattle raid, but also agrees that the battle was historical and that the causes would have been political, although the date is still uncertain. Johnson concluded: "The most reasonable reason why Arthur's death was associated with 537 is because as a king he was associated with the fertility of his kingdom and 537 was a period of famine. It would have made perfect sense to a medieval scholar with a British cultural background that the death of a renowned king had caused [that]."

However, other historians regard Arthur and the Battle of Camlann as legendary. Nick Higham argued that, as Camlann is not mentioned in the list of Arthur's battles in the ninth-century Historia Brittonum, the source of the Annales Cambriae entry was probably an Old Welsh elegy or lament about a different Arthur, perhaps one listed in the genealogy of the kings of Dyfed. Michael Wood takes a more nuanced view: that Arthur's historicity "is possible", noting that the entry on Camlann is written in a terse style unlike the other mention of Arthur (at Badon), and is linguistically similar to other, unsuspect passages of the Annales, perhaps offering "genuine testimony for Arthur's existence."

== Legendary versions ==
=== Medieval Welsh tradition ===
Besides the Annales Cambriae, one of the earliest mentions of Camlann is found in the circa 9th/10th-century Englynion y Beddau ("Stanzas of the Graves", Stanza 12) from the Black Book of Carmarthen, as the site of the grave of Osfran's son. The Welsh prose text Culhwch and Olwen, dated to the 11th or 12th century, mentions the battle twice in connection to heroes who fought there. The text includes a triad naming Morfran ail Tegid, Sandde Bryd Angel, and Cynwyl Sant as the three men who survived Camlann: Morfran because of his fearsome ugliness, Sandde because of his angelic beauty, and Cynwyl because he left Arthur last. This triad shows that Camlann was famous as a battle that few survived. Caitlin Green suggests that "Osfran's son" from the Englynion y Beddau is connected to Morfran from Culhwch and Olwen. The text also mentions Gwyn Hywar, overseer of Cornwall and Devon, one of the nine men who plotted the Battle of Camlann, suggesting a now-lost tradition of complex intrigue underpinning Arthur's last battle.

The Welsh Triads offer clues to the alleged cause of the Battle of Camlann. Triad 51 largely reflects (and is derived from) Geoffrey (see below): Medrawd (Mordred) rebels against Arthur while the latter is campaigning on the continent and usurps the throne, instigating the battle. Triad 53 lists a slap Gwenhwyvach gave to her sister Gwenhwyfar (Guinevere), wife of Arthur, as one of the "Three Harmful Blows of the Island of Britain", causing the Strife of Camlann. Calling Camlann one of Britain's "Three Futile Battles", Triad 84 also mentions this dispute between sisters. Triad 54 describes Medrawd raiding Arthur's court, throwing Gwenhwyfar to the ground and beating her. Other Triads in which Camlann is mentioned include Triad 30 ("Three Faithless War Bands") and Triad 59 ("Three Unfortunate Counsels").

Camlann is mentioned in Peniarth MS.37, a 14th-century copy of the Gwentian code of the Cyfraith Hywel (Welsh law), which (according to Peter Bartrum) shows that it was a topic familiar to Welsh writers. The law states "when the queen shall will a song in the chamber, let the bard sing a song respecting Camlan, and that not loud, lest the hall be disturbed." The 15th/16th-century poet Tudur Aled says that the battle came about through the treachery of Medrod and happened "about two nuts". In the 13th/14th-century Welsh tale The Dream of Rhonabwy, the immediate cause of the battle is a deliberate provocation by Arthur's rogue peace envoy named Iddawg (Iddawc Cordd Prydain) who intentionally insulted Medrawd.

=== Chronicle tradition ===
Geoffrey of Monmouth included the Battle of Camlann in his pseudo-historical chronicle Historia Regum Britanniae, written circa 1136. Geoffrey's version drew on existing Welsh tradition, but embellished the account with invented details. His focus was not on individuals but the 'character of the British nation'. In Books X and IX, Arthur goes to war against the Roman leader Lucius Tiberius, leaving his nephew Modredus (Mordred) in charge of Britain. In Arthur's absence, Modredus secretly marries Arthur's wife Guenhuvara (Guinevere) and takes the throne for himself. Arthur returns and his army faces Modredus' at Camblana (the River Camel in Cornwall). Many are killed, including Modredus; Arthur is mortally wounded and taken to the Isle of Avalon to recover, passing the crown to his kinsman Constantine.

Geoffrey's work was highly influential, and was adapted into various other languages, including Wace's Anglo-Norman Roman de Brut (c. 1155), Layamon's Middle English Brut (early 13th century), and the Welsh Brut y Brenhinedd (mid-13th century). Various later works are based fairly closely on Geoffrey, including the Middle English Alliterative Morte Arthure, written around 1400. The chronicle tradition typically follows Geoffrey in placing Camlann on the Camel in Cornwall: Wace places it at "Camel, over against the entrance to Cornwall," and Layamon specifies the location as Camelford, where John Aubrey reports that as signs of the battle "pieces of armour both for horse and man are many times found in digging of the ground" in his Monumenta Britannica (1663–1693). In Layamon's telling, only Arthur and his two nameless knights are left alive after the battle. Wace wrote: "I neither know who lost, nor who gained that day. No man wists the name of overthrower or of overthrown. All alike are forgotten, the victor with him who died."

=== Romance tradition ===
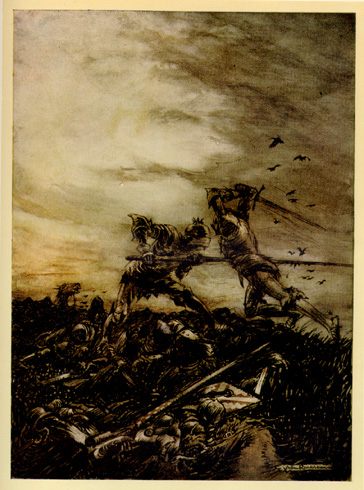
How Mordred was Slain by Arthur, and How by Him Arthur was Hurt to the Death, by Arthur Rackham (1917)

Further traditions about Arthur's final battle are developed in the Arthurian chivalric romances. These often follow Geoffrey's blueprint, but alter many of the details. The legend shifts to the 'character of individuals' and the proposed adultery between Guinevere and Lancelot is first mentioned.

In the Vulgate Mort Artu, part of the French Lancelot-Grail (Vulgate) cycle, Arthur goes to France not to fight the Romans, but to pursue his former prime knight Lancelot, who had engaged in an affair with Guinevere and killed Arthur's nephews (Mordred's and Gawain's siblings) Agravain, Gaheris and Gareth. He leaves Mordred in charge of Britain when he departs, only for Mordred to betray him and seize the throne. Arthur brings his veteran army back to Britain, where they meet Mordred's forces outnumbering them two-to-one with his British supporters and foreign allies (Saxon and Irish) at Salisbury Plain in south central England (Camlann is not mentioned). The fighting begins by an accident of fate, when a startled knight draws his sword to kill an adder during the standoff negotiations between Mordred and Arthur. After great numbers die on both sides (including several other kings and most of the Knights of the Round Table remaining after the Grail Quest), Arthur kills Mordred in a duel, but is himself mortally wounded. The dying Arthur tasks his knight (depending on the telling, either Griflet or Bedivere) with returning his sword Excalibur to the Lady of the Lake, and he is then taken to Avalon. The Mort Artu narration laments that the brutal and bloody battle resulted in the deaths of so many that, afterwards, Arthur's "kingdom of Logres was doomed to destruction, and many others [in Britain] with it."

This account of Arthur's last battle was adapted into many subsequent works of the period from 13th to 15th century, including the Old French Post-Vulgate Cycle (in which Arthur refuses to make peace with Mordred), the Middle English Stanzaic Morte Arthur, and Thomas Malory's influential Middle English work Le Mort d'Arthur. These works almost all locate the battle at Salisbury. The Didot-Perceval uniquely locates it at a Saxon-ruled island in Ireland where Mordred had taken refuge while pursued by Arthur. In the Italian La Tavola Ritonda, Mordred is actually victorious as he survives Arthur's death in their battle and then becomes the new king, only to be later defeated by Lancelot.

=== Avalon stories ===
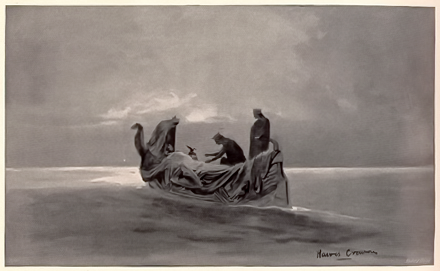
The Passing of Arthur, a scene painting by Hawes Craven (1895)

In a popular motif, introduced by Geoffrey in Historia and elaborated in his later Vita Merlini, Arthur was then taken from the battlefield of Camlann to Avalon, an often otherworldly and magical isle, in hope that he could be saved. Geoffrey has Arthur delivered to Morgen (Morgan le Fay) in Avalon by Taliesin guided by Barinthus, replaced by two unnamed women in the Brut. Later authors of the prose cycles featured Morgan herself (usually with two or more other ladies with her) arriving in a fairy boat to take the king away, the scene made iconic through its inclusion in Le Morte d'Arthur.

Some accounts, such as the Stanzaic Morte Arthur and the Alliterative Morte Arthure, as well as the commentary by Gerald of Wales, declare that Arthur died in Avalon (identifying it as Glastonbury Tor) and has been buried there. Geoffrey gives only a hopeful possibility (but not assurance) for Arthur's wounds to be healed eventually, but a successful revival of Arthur by Morgan is stated as a fact in the rewrite of Geoffrey in the Gesta Regum Britanniae; Wace and Layamon also tell this did happen, claiming that Arthur is about to return. Other versions, like the Vulgate Mort Artu and Malory's Le Morte d'Arthur, do not give a definitive answer to Arthur's ultimate fate.

== See also ==
- Battle of Badon
