= Lucan (Arthurian legend) =

Arthurian legendary knight

- Matter of Britain character
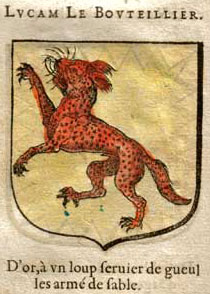
- Attributed arms of 'Lucam Le Bouteillier' , featuring a 'wolf lynx'
- First appearance: Erec and Enide

In-universe information
- Title: Sir
- Occupation: Butler, Knight of the Round Table, wine steward
- Family: Bedivere, Griflet
- Home: Camelot

Lucan the Butler, also known as Lucan the Wine Steward, is a character in the Arthurian legend where he is a personal servant and court official in the service of King Arthur. He is also one of Arthur's both original and final Knights of the Round Table, and his relatives notably include Bedivere and Griflet.

== Names ==
Some forms of his name include the following ones:

- Erec and Enide: Lucans i fu li botteliers
- First Continuation of Perceval: Lucan le Bouteillier
- Lancelot-Grail Cycle (and its variants and adaptations): Lucan, Lucas, Lucans, Lucant; -li Bouteillier (Lucas the Botiller in the English Merlin, Lucan le Boutellier in the Livre d'Artus, Lucan de Bottelere in Lancelot of the Laik)
- Prose Tristan: Lucans li Bouteillier
- Of Arthour and of Merlin: Lucan, Lucans, Lucas, Bricanc
- Sir Gawain and the Green Knight: Lucan the gode (Lucan the Good)
- Le Morte d'Arthur: Lucan de Butlere, Lucan the Bottler, Lucas the Bottlere (Lucanere the Butteler in William Caxton's edition).

== Legend ==
His earliest (casual) mention is found in Chrétien's Erec et Enide as "Lucan the cup-bearer". Lucan becomes a prominent character in the Arthurian cyclical prose, where he and his relatives, in particular his brother Bedivere (Arthur's cup-bearer in Geoffrey's earlier Historia Regum Britanniae) and cousin Griflet, are among King Arthur's earliest allies in the war against the rebel kings and then remain loyal to him throughout his life. His name is among the 25 included on the Winchester Round Table.

In most accounts of Arthur's death in the romance literature, from the Lancelot-Grail cycle to Le Morte d'Arthur (where his father is named as Duke Corneus), Sir Lucan is one of the last knights at the king's side at the Battle of Camlann (Salisbury) and is usually the last of them to die. He fights for Arthur's right to the throne at the Battle of Bedegraine and against subsequent rebellions. He then takes on the post of butler, a significant position in charge of the royal household, where he works alongside Bedivere the marshal and Kay the seneschal, and is known to always attend the royal tournaments.

Lucan stays with Arthur throughout the conflict with Lancelot, and on occasion acts as a negotiator between them. He remains by Arthur's side during Mordred's rebellion and tries to dissuade Arthur from his final attack on his son/nephew, but is unsuccessful and the king becomes fatally wounded. Worried about looters roaming the battlefield, Lucan and either Griflet or Bedivere attempt to move the dying Arthur into a nearby chapel for safety, but the strain is too much for Lucan and his old wound bursts open, spilling out his bowels and killing him just before the king returns Excalibur to the Lady of the Lake. Though the knight whom Arthur asks to cast the sword into the lake is usually either Griflet (Vulgate Mort Artu) or Bedivere (Le Morte d'Arthur, the Alliterative Morte Arthure, the Stanzaic Morte Arthur), the 16th-century English ballad King Arthur's Death ascribes this act to Lucan, described as the Duke of Gloucester.

=== Other Lucan characters ===
According to The Arthurian Name Dictionary, another Arthurian 'Lucan' character was that of a relative of Joseph of Arimathea mentioned in the Vulgate Lancelot, "charged with guarding the ark that contained the Holy Grail. He accompanied his uncle to Britain, died, and was buried there. Lancelot visited his tomb on the way to a duel at Nohaut." His story is again told in the Vulgate The History of the Grail, which also mentions another Joseph-era character named Lucan the Philosopher.

== Modern culture ==
Lucan as a survivor of Camlann is a major character in Roderick MacLeish's 1983 novel Prince Ombra. Lucan's squire, who finds him dead and Arthur missing, is the protagonist and narrator of Elizabeth Wyrick Thompson's short story "The Last Road" included in the 2000 anthology The Doom of Camelot. A character named Lucan appears in the 2004 film King Arthur where, played by Johnny Brennan, he is a young boy found and cared for by Arthur's warrior Dagonet.
