= Sanddef =

Welsh mythological figure, warrior in King Arthur's court

Sanddef Pryd Angel (Middle Welsh: Sanddev; also spelled Sandde in Modern Welsh) is a figure of Welsh tradition. He usually figures as a warrior of King Arthur's court, and is distinguished by his great beauty, which gives him his epithet Pryd or Bryd Angel (Angel's Form).

== Role in Welsh tradition ==
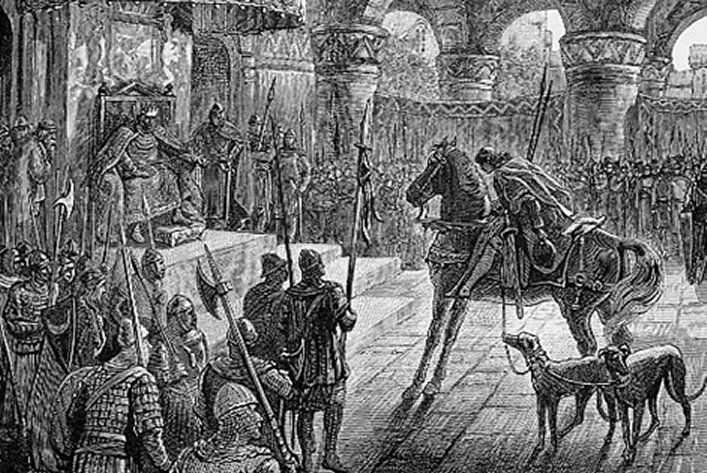
Arthur's court at Celliwig in Culhwch and Olwen, 1881

Sanddef's beauty contrasts with the hideousness of Morfran, with whom Sanddef is associated. Both are mentioned in the medieval prose tale Culhwch ac Olwen, where it is said that they survived the Battle of Camlann due to their looks. In Sanddef's case, no one dared strike him because they thought he was "an angel helping" due to his beauty. He is further mentioned in an early poem lamenting the death of Duran fab Arthur, in which Arthur asks him to shoo a crow from his son's corpse.

Unlike Morfran, Sanddef does not appear in any of the early Welsh Triads. However, he is again associated with Morfran in Triad 7 of the 15th-century collection known as "The Twenty-four Knights of Arthur's Court". In this triad, adapted from Culhwch, Sanddef's beauty makes him one of the "Three Irresistible Knights" no man can refuse.

The name Sanddef appears in the Book of Llan Dav and in two poems in Canu Llywarch Hen, where it is the name of one of Llywarch Hen's sons. In at least one variant of the second poem, this Sanddef is called "Bryd Angel," suggesting the author knew of the Camlann tradition.
