= St Michael and All Angels Church, Sunninghill =

Church in Sunninghill, Berkshire

Coordinates: 51°24′32″N 00°39′01″W

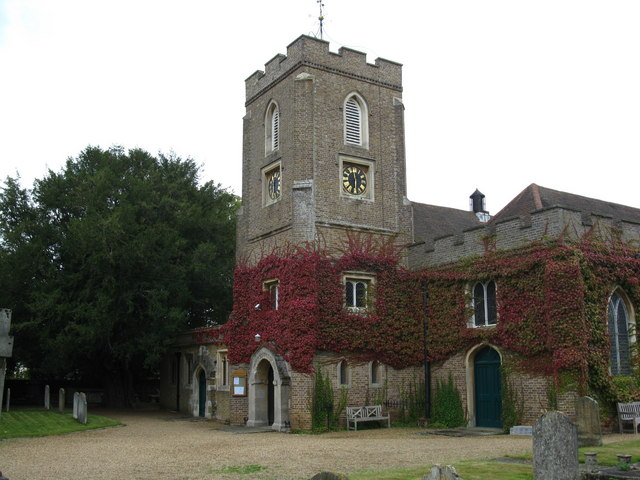
The Church of Saint Michael and All Angels in September 2009

The Church of Saint Michael and All Angels is in the village of Sunninghill, in Berkshire, England. It is an active Anglican parish church in the diocese of Oxford. It is in the parish of Sunninghill and South Ascot with the church of All Souls in South Ascot. It is dedicated to Saint Michael and all angels.

== Background ==
It was originally established about AD 890 but was rebuilt in the Perpendicular Gothic style between 1808 and 1827. It is listed Grade II on the National Heritage List for England. The vestry, chancel, and the south chapel of the church were added in 1888 by William Henry Crossland. A zig zag archway was retained from the original Norman church. Crossland built the chapel in memory of Thomas Holloway, whose funeral had taken place at the church. Five windows were placed in Holloway's memory. It was funded by Sir George Martin-Holloway. Holloway is buried in a vault at the church with his wife and sister.

The historic residence of The Cedars is situated opposite the church. The former church green that adjoined Saint Michael's was sold to the owner of The Cedars in 1779. The front garden of the house was formerly part of the burial ground of the church.

The monument to Richard Fitzpatrick in the churchyard is listed Grade II as is the monument to Francis Stone.

The church tower has three bells, with the first inscribed 'William Eldridge Made Mee 1662', the second 'S. O K 1705' and the third was made by John Warner in London with a date of 1867.

Rear Admiral Home Riggs Popham who served in the Revolutionary and Napoleonic Wars is buried in the churchyard. His tomb was restored by the 1805 Club. Popham's tomb has reliefs marking his participation in the naval battles of Copenhagen, Cape of Good Hope, in northern Spain, and the British invasions of the River Plate in the Napoleonic Wars.

There are nine Commonwealth War Graves Commission memorials in the churchyard, marking the burial place of British military personnel from the First and Second World War.

Nikolaus Pevsner describes the chancel roof as "extremely busy".
