= The Cedars, Sunninghill =

Building in Sunninghill, Berkshire, England

Coordinates: 51°24′34″N 00°39′03″W

The Cedars is a large detached house in Sunninghill, Berkshire.

It is two storeys in height, painted white render and has a hipped slate roof. The house has a roughly rectangular plan. It was initially built in the early 19th century and subsequently expanded. A large conservatory was added in the 20th century; this was the site of an indoor swimming pool in the 1990s. It has been listed Grade II on the National Heritage List for England since March 1972. It is named for the prominent cedar trees in its grounds. A stream runs through the grounds. A thatched mock dairy building in the Gothic Revival style with stained-glass windows stands in the garden. It is also listed Grade II.

== History ==
It is situated opposite the Church of Saint Michael and All Angels. The former church green that adjoined Saint Michael's was sold to the owner of The Cedars in 1779. The front garden of the house was formerly part of the burial ground of the church.

The Cedars was owned by the politician John Yorke in the 18th century; he sold it to the antiquary George Ellis. Ellis was a friend of Prime Minister George Canning. Ellis was a frequent correspondent of the novelist Walter Scott; Scott wrote two cantos of his epic prose poem Marmion in the garden of the residence. A stone in the garden of The Cedars marks Scott's favourite spot. Scott and his wife, Charlotte Charpentier, stayed with Ellis at The Cedars for a week with their friends Richard Heber and Francis Douce. While staying with Ellis and his wife, Scott read the first two or three cantos of the Lay of the Last Minstrel to his hosts under an old oak tree in Windsor Forest.

The house was the residence of Harriet Moore in the mid-19th century. Moore was the sister of the geologist John Carrick Moore and attended lectures at the Royal Institution given by Michael Faraday in the summer of 1850. Moore wrote to Faraday from The Cedars and told him and his wife Sarah that the geologists Charles and Mary Horner Lyell had recently stayed at the house and were now "geologizing in the Hartz mountains". In the 1860s it was the residence of Charles Anderson-Pelham, 3rd Earl of Yarborough, peer and MP for Great Grimsby. Caroline Elizabeth, the widow of Charles Pepys, 1st Earl of Cottenham, died at the house in 1868. It was for sale with 18 acres of land in 1935.

The Cedars was profiled by Katherine Bergen in The Times as its 'House of the Week' in March 1997. It was on sale with Knight Frank and Savills for £3 million (equivalent to £5,913,798 in 2025). Bergen described the rear of the house as "more imposing than the front" and that it was "not seen to its best advantage from the front because it can be approached only obliquely from the side". Bergen likened the appearance of The Cedars to the White House in Washington, D.C. and wrote that its "...endless large windows give the interior a kind of crystalline light that painters such as Vermeer would have swooned for".
