= Stanzaic Morte Arthur =

14th-century Middle English poem

The Stanzaic Morte Arthur is an anonymous 14th-century Middle English poem in 3,969 lines, about the adulterous affair between Lancelot and Guinevere, and Lancelot's tragic dissension with King Arthur. The poem is usually called the Stanzaic Morte Arthur or Stanzaic Morte (formerly also the Harleian Morte Arthur) to distinguish it from another Middle English poem, the Alliterative Morte Arthure. It exercised enough influence on Thomas Malory's Le Morte d'Arthur to have, in the words of one recent scholar, "played a decisive though largely unacknowledged role in the way succeeding generations have read the Arthurian legend".

== Synopsis ==
King Arthur holds a tournament, which Sir Lancelot attends in disguise. He stays for one night at the castle of the Earl of Ascolat, and there the earl's daughter falls in love with him, even though she knows Lancelot loves someone else. Lancelot is injured at the tournament, and is invited by the earl to recuperate at Ascolat. Lancelot leaves when he has recovered, giving the earl's daughter his armour as a memento.

Ascolat is then visited by Gawain, who has come from Camelot to search for Lancelot. The earl's daughter, still not knowing Lancelot's name, shows Gawain the armour, which he recognises. On his return to Camelot Gawain tells Arthur that Lancelot loves the earl's daughter. When Lancelot arrives at Camelot he receives so little welcome from his lover, Guinevere, that he leaves again in confusion. Guinevere then finds herself falsely accused of murdering a Scottish knight, and must find a champion to defend her in a trial by combat. The body of the maid of Ascolat is discovered in a boat, floating down the river into Camelot, along with a note in which the maid bewails Lancelot's refusal of her love. Lancelot returns to successfully defend Guinevere, and since she now knows that he is true to her she is reconciled with him. The two are surprised in bed together by several of Arthur's knights, but Lancelot escapes, killing in the process all of the knights except Mordred.

Guinevere is sentenced to death, but Lancelot again rescues her and takes her to his castle, Joyous Gard. Arthur besieges Joyous Gard, but without effect. The Pope now orders Lancelot to send Guinevere back to Arthur, and Arthur to accept her. Both comply, but Lancelot goes into exile. Arthur takes his army abroad to levy war against Lancelot, leaving Guinevere behind in the custody of Mordred. Gawain, now an inveterate enemy of Lancelot, fights a single combat with him, and is defeated. Word comes that Mordred has crowned himself king and plans to marry Guinevere. Arthur returns home and defeats Mordred's army in two battles, but Gawain is killed.

Before a third battle can be fought Arthur dreams that he is cast down from the high point of the Wheel of Fortune. In a second dream Gawain warns him he must call a truce so as to give Lancelot's army time to join him. The next day Arthur and Mordred, each accompanied by fourteen knights, meet to discuss peace terms. The truce is broken by mistake when one of the knights draws his sword to kill an adder. Battle is joined and the armies are so equally matched that both are exterminated, with the exception of Mordred, Arthur, and Arthur's knights Bedivere and Lucan. Arthur kills Mordred, but is himself mortally wounded.

At Arthur's command, Bedivere throws Excalibur into the sea. Three ladies come to take Arthur to Avalon to be healed, but they fail in this purpose, and the next day Bedivere comes across Arthur's newly erected tomb. Guinevere, repenting of her adultery, takes the veil at Amesbury. Lancelot arrives on the scene belatedly and visits Guinevere. They renounce each other in favour of a life of penance, and Lancelot accordingly becomes a monk. The poem ends with their death and burial seven years later.

== Composition and metre ==
The poem is the work of an anonymous writer who lived during the 14th century in the north Midlands. His source was the French prose romance La Mort Artu, but he compressed it to a romance only about one fifth of the Mort Artu's length. He probably intended his work for a wide and relatively unsophisticated audience. He cast his work in the metre of a minstrel romance ballad, each stanza containing eight lines rhyming ABABABAB, and each line having four beats. As the poem has come down to us there are seven places where the stanza is two lines short, but the original poem may not have had that fault. The poet took many liberties with his rhymes, and also used more alliteration than is common in a Middle English rhyming romance.

== Manuscript and early descriptions ==
It survives in one manuscript only, British Museum Harley 2252, a collection of texts compiled in the early 16th century by a London bookseller called John Colyns. Close study has shown that the section containing the Stanzaic Morte was originally a separate commercially produced booklet. One leaf, dealing with the burial of the Maid of Astolat, is now missing. By 1570, the manuscript had passed into the possession of one Robert Farrers.

The manuscript was studied by Humfrey Wanley, keeper of the Harleian Library, who in 1759 catalogued it with the notation, "This I take to be translated from the French Romance of K. Arthur"; also "I know not who this Poet was, but guess that he lived about the time of K. Henry VII, and that he might have been a Northern man. He useth many Saxon or obsolete Words, and very often delighted himself (as did the Author of 'Piers Plowman') in the Chime of words beginning with the same letter." Thomas Percy, mentioning the Stanzaic Morte in his widely influential Reliques of Ancient English Poetry (1765), suggested that it could be older than Wanley thought, since the first line was, he believed, quoted in the Middle English romance of Beves of Hamtoun. Thomas Warton's History of English Poetry (1774–81) includes a short extract from the Morte, and dates it to the early 14th century. In Observations on the Three First Volumes of The History of English Poetry (1782), and again in Ancient Engleish Metrical Romanceës (1802), the antiquary Joseph Ritson ridiculed Warton's and Percy's views of the poem's date, and asserted that Wanley was correct in assigning it to the reign of Henry VII. He noticed the similarities with Thomas Malory's Le Morte d'Arthur, but believed that the poem was based on Malory rather than vice versa.

A lengthy but rather facetious synopsis of the Morte, with quotations, figured in the Specimens of Early English Metrical Romances (1805) by George Ellis. Ritson's late date for the poem was there rejected. A complete edition of the Morte by Thomas Ponton was published by the Roxburghe Club in 1819.

== Influence on Malory ==
It is now widely accepted that the last two stories of Malory's Le Morte d'Arthur, "The Book of Sir Launcelot and Queen Guinevere" and "The Most Piteous Tale of the Morte Arthur", are derived from his reading of the Stanzaic Morte Arthur and its source, the Mort Artu. Several key moments in these final stories, such as the poignant scene of renunciation between Lancelot and Guinevere at Amesbury, and the tragic incident where a knight inadvertently breaks the truce between Arthur and Mordred by killing an adder, are notably influenced by the Stanzaic Morte. In places he even reproduces the exact words of the Middle English poem. According to Jennifer Goodman, "Malory owes to the stanzaic Morte Arthur an important share of the drama of the closing books of his work."

== Scholastic reception ==
Brian Stone thought that "with its swiftly moving narrative and realistic clash of character" it is more like an extended tragic ballad than a romance. He preferred its ending to that of the Morte Darthur, and considered the poem to be "of prime importance in our culture". Dieter Mehl referred to "The by no means simple, but skilfully handled metrical form"; to "a rare balance in the structure of the plot, a strict subordination of details to the theme of the poem, and a notable lack of digressions which could slow down the tempo of the narration"; and to a "conscious simplicity and detachment that distinguish Le Morte Arthur from most other romances and make it so particularly attractive and appealing to modern taste." Rosemary Woolf called the Stanzaic Morte "the finest example of the English treatment of central Arthurian subject-matter before Malory's Morte Darthur."

Praise from some others has been more measured. Jennifer Goodman wrote that "The verse is workmanlike: an acute sense of character and action allow the poet to focus in on the essential elements of fate and personality that combine to create Arthur's tragedy." Lucy Allen Paton complained of the Morte's poet that "his supply of rhyme-words is extraordinarily limited", and that "he lacks the vigour of imagination, the intensity of feeling and the originality in description that the poet of the [Alliterative] Morte Arthure possessed", but went on "he manifests real power as an easy and agreeable story-teller…Perhaps his most noticeable characteristic is his facility in bringing before us by a few direct dramatic words the human interest of the scenes that he is describing." Robert W. Ackerman judged that "Though marred by faults typical of the minstrel style, it tells a moving story vividly and swiftly." George Kane's opinion was that "Never once in its four thousand lines does it attain to brilliance, yet its effect is so unmistakably one of fulfillment and of harmony between intention and result that it must be regarded as a success."

== Bibliography ==
=== Editions ===
- Thomas Ponton (ed.) Le Morte Arthur. The Adventures of Sir Launcelot du Lake. Roxburghe Club 25. London: Bulmer, 1819.
- Frederick James Furnivall (ed.) Le Morte d'Arthur: edited from the Harleian MS. 2252. London: Macmillan, 1864.
- J. D. Bruce (ed.) Le Morte Arthur. Early English Text Soc., Extra Series 88. 1903.
- Samuel Burdett Hemingway (ed.) Le Morte Arthur: A Middle English Metrical Romance. Boston/New York: Houghton, Mifflin, 1912.
- L. A. Paton (ed.) Morte Arthur: Two Early English Romances. London: Everyman, 1912.
- Larry Dean Benson (ed.) King Arthur's Death: The Middle English Stanzaic Morte Arthur and Alliterative Morte Arthure. Indianapolis: Bobbs-Merrill, 1974.
- P. F. Hissiger (ed.) Le Morte Arthur: A Critical Edition. The Hague/Paris: Mouton, 1975.
- Larry Dean Benson (ed.) King Arthur's Death: The Middle English Stanzaic Morte Arthur and Alliterative Morte Arthure. Exeter: University of Exeter Press, 1986. Revised by Edward E. Foster, Kalamazoo, MI: Western Michigan University for TEAMS, 1994.
- Shunichi Noguchi (ed.) Le Morte Arthur. Tokyo: University of Tokyo, 1990.

=== Translations ===
- Sharon Kahn (trans.) The Stanzaic Morte. Lanham, MD: University Press of America, 1986.
- Brian Stone (trans.) King Arthur's Death: Alliterative Morte Arthure and Stanzaic Le morte Arthur. London: Penguin, 1988.

== Sources ==
- Ackerman, Robert W. (1974) [1959]. "English Rimed and Prose Romances". In Loomis, Roger Sherman (ed.). Arthurian Literature in the Middle Ages. Oxford: Clarendon Press. ISBN 0198115881.
- Benson, Larry D.; Foster, Edward E. (1994). King Arthur's Death: The Middle English Stanzaic Morte Arthur and Alliterative Morte Arthure. Kalamazoo: Medieval Institute Publications. ISBN 1879288389.
- Bruce, J. Douglas, ed. (1903). Le Morte Arthur: A Romance in Stanzas of Eight Lines. Early English Text Society. Extra Series, 88. Oxford: Oxford University Press.
- Goodman, Jennifer R. (1988). The Legend of Arthur in British and American Literature. Boston: Twayne. ISBN 9780805769654.
- Johnston, Arthur (1964). Enchanted Ground. London: The Athlone Press.
- Stone, Brian (trans.) (1988). King Arthur's death: Alliterative Morte Arthure and Stanzaic Le Morte Arthur. London: Penguin. ISBN 0140444459.
- Weinberg, Carole (1999). "The Stanzaic Morte Arthur". In Barron, W. R. J. (ed.). The Arthur of the English: The Arthurian Legend in Medieval Life and Literature. Cardiff: University of Wales Press. ISBN 0708314775.
