= Ancient Engleish Metrical Romanceës =

Ancient Engleish Metrical Romanceës (1802) is a collection of Middle English verse romances edited by the antiquary Joseph Ritson; it was the first such collection to be published. The book appeared to mixed reviews and very poor sales, but it continued to be consulted well into the 20th century by scholars, and is considered "a remarkably accurate production for its day".

== Contents ==
Volume 1

- Dissertation on Romance and Minstrelsy
- Ywain and Gawain
- Launfal

Volume 2

- Lybeaus Disconus
- The Geste of Kyng Horn
- The King of Tars, and the Soudan of Damas
- Emare
- Sir Orpheo
- Chronicle of England

Volume 3

- Le Bone Florence of Rome
- The Erle of Toulous
- The Squyer of Lowe Degre
- The Knight of Curtesy, and the Fair Lady of Faguell
- Notes [including an edition of Horn Childe and Maiden Rimnild]
- Glossary

== Composition ==
Up to this point only three complete Middle English romances had appeared in scholarly editions: Golagrus and Gawain and The Awntyrs of Arthure had been published by John Pinkerton, and Launfal by George Ellis. Thomas Percy's Reliques of Ancient English Poetry, arguably the ultimate source of inspiration for Ritson's collection, did not include any mediaeval romance in full, and only the synopsis of Lybeaus Disconus. Ritson approached the task with his usual insistence on the highest standards of editorial fidelity to the original text. "Every article", he wrote, "is derive'd from some ancient manuscript, or old printed copy, of the authenticity of which the reader has all possible satisfaction; and is printed with an accuracy, and adherence to the original, of which the publick has had very few examples". All manuscripts were transcribed by himself, with the exception of Sir Orpheo and The Erle of Toulous, copies of which were provided by Walter Scott and John Baynes respectively. Apart from being a literary scholar Ritson was also a spelling-reformer, and in all the editorial matter of the Romanceës he adopted his own system of "etymological" spelling, a fact which was to deter readers and be seized on by hostile reviewers.

Ritson's mental health was deteriorating as he worked on the book. He himself wrote of being "in continu'd state of il-health, and low spirits". This particularly manifested itself in the virulence of his many attacks on the poor scholarship of Percy, Pinkerton and Warton in a lengthy "Dissertation on Romance and Minstrelsy" with which he prefaced the work. In this Dissertation he addresses the problem of the origins of the romance form. He rejects not just Warton's theory that romance was a literary form that came to Europe from the Islamic world, but also the contentions of others that it came from the Celtic countries or from Scandinavia, concluding that its true point of origin was France. He proceeds first to a consideration of the state of the English language in the Middle Ages, which he thinks was at first too rude and undeveloped for French poets to have thought of borrowing romances from across the Channel, and then to a chronological survey of the English romances. Finally he considers the social history of the minstrel. This was a subject of long-standing dispute between himself and Thomas Percy, Percy holding that the minstrels enjoyed a high status in mediaeval society, while Ritson produced much evidence, here and elsewhere, to show that they were considered a low and vagabondish class. Such men, he thought, could not be the authors of the romances, which were rather the work of learned men. The Dissertation is piled high with relevant information, much of it new, but his theses are not always coherently developed, so that at times, as Monica Santini says, "the only thread of his argument is the continuous harrying of Warton".

== Publication ==
The difficult problem of finding a publisher willing to take on such an unpromising work was solved by Ritson's friend George Ellis, who undertook to fund the project. A delay of several months was caused by the discovery of a number of derogatory comments about the Christian religion in Ritson's text, which the publishers, G. and W. Nicol, insisted should be removed, but the three volumes eventually appeared in October 1802. A second edition, revised by Edmund Goldsmid, was published by E. and G. Goldsmid in 1884-1885. In 1891 this edition was reissued in a cut-down form, the romances being limited to Ywain and Gawain, Launfal and Lybeaus Disconus.

== Reception ==
Ritson's book bleakly anticipated its own financial and critical failure:

The editour abandons it to general censure, with cold indifference, expecting little favour, and less profit; but certain, at any rate, to be insulted by the malignant and calumnious personalitys of a base and prostitute gang of lurking assassins, who stab in the dark, and whose poison'd daggers he has allready experience'd.

The work was indeed a commercial flop, the market for unmodernized Middle English verse not yet being in existence, especially when even the editorial matter had to be read in reformed spelling. It was already being reported in 1806 that it had fallen into "undeserved neglect", and it was left to Ellis's Specimens of Early English Metrical Romances (1805) to capture the popular market.

The Romanceës were reviewed in the British Critic and the Critical Review, but not favourably or at length. Walter Scott, in the Edinburgh Review, was more friendly:

Let it be remembered to his honour, that, without the encouragement of private patronage, or of public applause; without hopes of gain, and under the certainty of severe critical censure, he has brought forward such a work on national antiquities, as in other countries has been thought worthy of the labour of universities, and the countenance of princes.

He stressed the importance of the romances to the historian in telling us how our ancestors lived, acted and spoke. In private Scott was more critical, writing to Ellis that the Dissertation "reminds one of a heap of rubbish, which had either turned out unfit for the architect's purpose, or beyond his skill to make use of". In later years he preferred Henry Weber's "Metrical Romances" (1810). The poet Robert Southey was an out-and-out enthusiast for the Romanceës. "Of all men living [Ritson is] the best qualified for the task, and the most trustworthy" he wrote in the Annual Review. In a letter to Coleridge he called it "a treasure of true old poetry…Ritson is the oddest, but most honest, of all our antiquaries, and he abuses Percy & Pinkerton with less mercy than justice." He encouraged the writer William Taylor to find subjects for new poetry in Ritson's Romanceës. Thomas De Quincey knew and admired the Romanceës enough to induce Coleridge to include passages from them in his Royal Institution lectures on poetry, to their benefit. In fact he had enough readers among the writers of the Romantic movement to ensure a measurable influence on it.

By the end of the 19th century the Middle English scholarship of Ritson's Romanceës was no longer the state of the art. Walter Skeat pointed out a number of mistakes in the glossary, and remarked that the Romanceës was "a valuable book in its way, but we must not trust it too much". Nevertheless, in 1938 Ritson's biographer Bertrand Bronson could point out that "Scholars still refer to these volumes with a frequency which is homage to the quality of Ritson's labor", and in 1989 the critic Rolf P. Lessenich wrote that it has "remained a useful edition across the centuries".
