= The Squire of Low Degree =

Anonymous English verse romance

The Squire of Low Degree, also known as The Squyr of Lowe Degre, The Sqyr of Lowe Degre or The Sqyr of Lowe Degree, is an anonymous late Middle English or early Modern English verse romance. There is little doubt that it was intended to be enjoyed by the masses rather than the wealthy or aristocratic sections of society, and, perhaps in consequence of this, it was one of the better-known of the English romances during the Elizabethan and Jacobean eras, and again in the 19th century. There are three texts of the poem: it was printed by Wynkyn de Worde c. 1520 under the title Undo Youre Dore, though only fragments totalling 180 lines survive of this book; around 1555 or 1560 another edition in 1132 lines was produced by William Copland; and a much shorter version, thought to have been orally transmitted, was copied into Bishop Percy's Folio Manuscript around the middle of the 17th century. The precise date of the poem is unknown, estimates varying from 1440 to 1520, but Henry Bradley's date of c. 1475 has been quite widely adopted. Standing as it does at the very end of the English Middle Ages it has been called "a swan song of the romance".

== Synopsis ==
It was a squyer of lowe degré
That loved the kings doughter of Hungré.

— lines 1–2

After seven years of undeclared love the squire opens his heart to the princess. She replies that she loves him, but that as a mere squire he will have to prove himself by fighting his way to Jerusalem and laying his sword on the Holy Sepulchre. Only this, she believes, will be enough to convince her father that they should marry. Their conversation is overheard by the king's steward, who steals off to the king to report it, and adds the malicious lie that the squire has made an attempt on the princess's virtue. The king has a good opinion of the squire and is reluctant to believe this, but tells the steward to watch the princess's room closely to see whether the squire will visit her. The squire now goes to the king to ask his leave to go abroad adventuring. On being given this permission the squire sets out, but turns aside from his way to visit the princess's chamber and make his farewells. There, finding the steward and a numerous body of men-at-arms lying in wait for him, he asks the princess to let him in.

Anone he sayde: "Your dore undo!
Undo," he sayde, "nowe, fayre lady!
I am beset with many a spy.
Lady as whyte as whales bone,
There are thyrty agaynst me one."

— lines 534–538

But she, as a virtuous unmarried lady, turns him from her door and tells him to win her in marriage. Now the steward and his men approach the chamber to take the squire prisoner. Though he resists to such good effect that the steward is killed, the squire is finally taken prisoner by the steward's men. These men mutilate the dead steward's face, dress him in the squire's clothes, and leave him at the princess's door hoping she will mistake him for the squire. The princess is taken in by this trick, embalms the body of the dead steward and keeps it in a tomb by her bed. Meanwhile the squire is taken to the king, who imprisons him. Finally, finding that his daughter is inconsolable, the king releases the squire and allows him to go abroad.

Anone the squyer passed the se.
In Tuskayne and in Lumbardy,
There he dyd great chyvalry.
In Portyngale nor yet in Spayne,
There myght no man stand hym agayne;
And where that ever that knyght gan fare,
The worshyp with hym away he bare.
And thus he travayled seven yere
In many a land bothe farre and nere,
Tyll on a day he thought hym tho
Unto the sepulture for to go.
And there he made his offerynge soone,
Right as the kinges doughter bad him don.

— lines 884–896

Having done all this he returns to Hungary. Here the princess, still lamenting her supposedly dead lover, has decided to retire from the world:

And, squyer, for the love of thee,
Fy on this worldes vanyté!
Farewell golde pure and fyne;
Farewell velvet and satyne;
Farewell castelles and maners also;
Farewell huntynge and hawkynge to;
Farewell revell, myrthe, and play;
Farewell pleasure and garmentes gay;
Farewell perle and precyous stone;
Farewell my juielles everychone;
Farewell mantell and scarlet reed;
Farewell crowne unto my heed;
Farewell hawkes, and farewell hounde;
Farewell markes and many a pounde;
Farewell huntynge at the hare;
Farewell harte and hynde for evermare.
Nowe wyll I take the mantell and the rynge,
And become an ancresse in my lyvynge.
And yet I am a mayden for thee.

— lines 939–957

Her father now belatedly tells her that she has been mourning the steward, and that the squire has returned from Jerusalem. He gives the lovers his blessing, and they marry.

== Reception ==
There are many references to the poem in the works of Edmund Spenser, Beaumont and Fletcher, and other Elizabethan writers – Shakespeare, for example, alludes to the poem when, in Henry V, Act V, sc. i, Fluellen says "You called me yesterday mountain-squire, but I will make you to-day a squire of low degree" – but as the 17th century advanced the poem fell into neglect. In the mid-18th century Thomas Percy acquired the famous Folio Manuscript, with its version of The Squire of Low Degree, and came to the mistaken conclusion that the poem was one of the romances satirised by Chaucer in his "Tale of Sir Thopas", and must therefore have been written in the 14th century. He communicated these opinions together with an extract from The Squire of Low Degree to his friend Thomas Warton, who included them in the 1762 edition of his Observations on the Fairy Queen of Spenser. Percy planned to edit The Squire as part of a proposed collection of Ancient English and Scottish Poems, but this plan fell through, and it was left to the medievalist Joseph Ritson to make the Copland text available to general readers in 1802 in his Ancient Engleish Metrical Romanceës [sic]. Walter Scott refers to the poem in several of his novels, and it particularly influences his Quentin Durward and The Fair Maid of Perth, in each of which the hero finds himself in a situation so parallel to that of the squire that he cannot help identifying with him. Thomas Love Peacock and George Eliot both used quotations from The Squire as epigraphs – to chapter 3 of Crotchet Castle and chapter 62 of Middlemarch respectively. The bibliographer William Carew Hazlitt produced another edition of the Copland text in his Remains of the Early Popular Poetry of England (1864–1866), and shortly afterwards the Folio MS text was published for the first time by John W. Hales and Frederick J. Furnivall in their edition of Bishop Percy's Folio Manuscript (1867–1868). James Russell Lowell wrote that the romance "Has passages that are unsurpassed in simple beauty by anything in our earlier poetry." William Edward Mead, in his standard edition of the romance, published in 1904, expressed an opinion closer to that of most modern critics when he said that

We can praise The Squyr of Lowe Degre only with considerable reservations, and do not seek a place for it among the great creative poems of the world. But it is interesting, at times charming, and it more than holds its own among poems of its class.

== Modern editions ==
- Mead, William Edward, ed. (1904). The Squyr of Lowe Degre. Boston: Ginn. Reprinted Whitefish, Montana: Kessinger, 2007.
- French, Walter Hoyt; Hale, Charles Brockway, eds. (1930). Middle English Metrical Romances. New York: Prentice-Hall. Reprinted New York: Russell & Russell, 1964.
- Sands, Donald B., ed. (1966). Middle English Verse Romances. New York: Holt, Rinehart & Winston. Reprinted Exeter: University of Exeter Press, 1986.
- Kooper, Erik, ed. (2006). Sentimental and Humorous Romances. Kalamazoo: Medieval Institute Publications.
  - "The Squire of Low Degree"
  - "The Squire of Low Degree, Percy Folio"
