= Griflet =

- Matter of Britain character
- Griflet's attributed arms
- First appearance: Erec and Enide

In-universe information
- Title: Sir
- Occupation: Knight of the Round Table
- Family: Bedivere, Lucan

Griflet (/ˈɡrɪflɪt/) the son of Do is a now-popular English variant of the name of a ubiquitous character in the Arthurian legend, where he is featured as one of both the first and the last of the Knights of the Round Table. He is notably the eponymous hero of his own, early chivalric romance, the Occitan-language Jaufre.

== Legend ==
He is first found in Chrétien de Troyes' Erec et Enide, named there as Gifflès (Giflez, Gifflez) li filz Do. Like many other Arthurian romance characters, his origins may lie in Welsh mythology; in his instance, with the minor deity Gilfaethwy fab Dôn.

He also appears under various other names, including as Gefflet (Gifflet, Grimfles, Gyfflet) in the English Prose Merlin, as Gerflet (Girflet, Girflez) in Béroul's Tristran and in the Norse Möttuls saga and Parcevals saga; as Gerflet li fius Do in Mériadeuc; as Gifflet in Escanor and in Froissart's Chroniques; as Girfles le fils Do (Gifflet fils de Do, Giflez li filz Doon de Carduel, Girfles li fieus Do, Girflet, Girflez li filz Dué, Gyrfles, Gyfflet, Gyfles, Gyflet, Gyrflet) in the Vulgate Cycle; as Giflez in the Livre d'Artus; as Giflés li fius Do in Renaut de Beaujeu's Li Biaus Descouneüs; as Giflet le fils de Do in Le Bel Inconnu; as Giflet fis Do in Sir Gawain and the Lady of Lys; as Girflez le fils Do (Girflet li flex Do, Gyrflet) in the Prose Tristan; as Girflés (Giflés li fix Do, Gvrflés li fil Do, Giflex le Filz, Gilflex, Gilflez, Gisflet le fil Doon, Girflet le fils Do, Girflez li filz Do, Gyrflés li fil Do) in the First, Second (not all variants) and Fourth continuations of Perceval ou le Conte du Graal; as Girflet (Gifflès li Fieus Do[u]) in the Post-Vulgate Cycle; as Giflez li filz Doe in Lancelot, le Chevalier de la Charrette; as Girflez in La Mule sans Frein; as Gofrei in Diu Crône, as Gryflet (Griflet; Griflet le Fise de Dieu, Gryflet le Fyse de Dieu, Gryfflet) in Le Morte d'Arthur; as Grifles (Gifflet, Gifles, Gilles) in Of Arthour and of Merlin; as Gryflette in Jacob van Maerlant's Merlÿn; as Gyffroun in Ywain and Gawain; as Gyrfles (Girfles, Girflet, Girflez, Girfleez, Gyrflees, Gyrflet, Gyrflez) in Henry Lovelich's Merlin, as Jaufré (Jaufry) in Jaufre; as Jofreit fiz Ydoel (Iofreit, Gyflet) in Parzival; and as Jeffron de Freudous (Geffron le Frediens, Gyffron le Fludous) in Libeaus Desconus. Further texts featuring him include Hunbaut and La Vengeance Raguidel.

In the Arthurian tradition from French chivalric romance prose cycles, Griflet is a cousin to Lucan and Bedivere who first appears as a loyal and valiant young squire at the beginning of King Arthur's rule. About the same age as Arthur, he distinguishes himself in the Battle of Bedegraine against the rebels and joins the Round Table after personally slaying one of the Saxon kings when he helps Kay and Gawain rescue Guinevere in the Prose Merlin. Later, however, his role becomes largely limited to him notoriously often falling into captivity for the other knights to rescue in the course of their own adventures, even leading Gawain to comment in the Prose Lancelot that "there never was a man so frequently taken prisoner as Girflet has been."

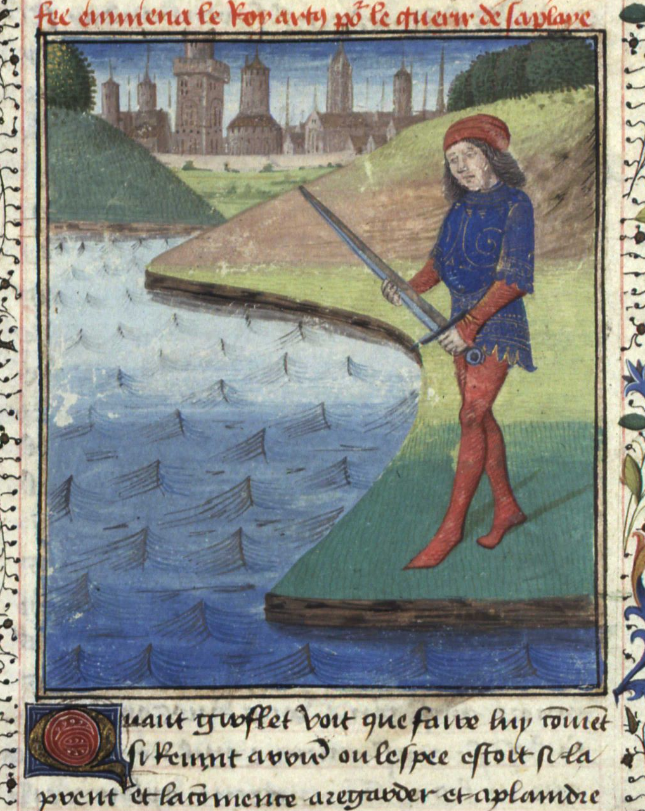
"Groflet" steeling himself to cast Excalibur away in a 1470 illustration for Mort du roi Arthur

According to the French Mort Artu, having been earlier in the romance seriously injured by Emperor Lucius just before Arthur killed Lucius, Grifletas one of the few survivors of Arthur's final battle and was asked by the dying king to return his sword Excalibur to the Lady of the Lake. Afterwards, he becomes a monk at the black chapel of Arthur's tomb.

Conversely, Thomas Malory in Le Morte d'Arthur has Sir Griflet is one of the knights killed by Lancelot's rescue party at the execution of Guinevere. Malory makes Griflet's cousin Bedivere the knight who casts away Excalibur into water at the end of the story, the role given to Bedivere also in the preceding English adaptations of the Mort Artu.

== Modern culture ==
- In Ed Greenwood's The Last Pendragon (2007), Griflet is a young squire fighting against an usurper a decade after the death of Arthur.
- Griflet appears as a supporting character for King Arthur in the video game Days Bygone.
- An inspired character named "Photon Archer, Griflet" appears in the Cardfight!! Vanguard franchise.
- As Girflet, he is the central character and protagonist of Jéhan Thiéry's novel series L'Alliance des Vaillants. Following the catastrophic Battle of Camlann (Salesbières) and the fall of Arthur, he stands as one of the few surviving loyal knights.
