= Ceridwen =

Character from Welsh mythology

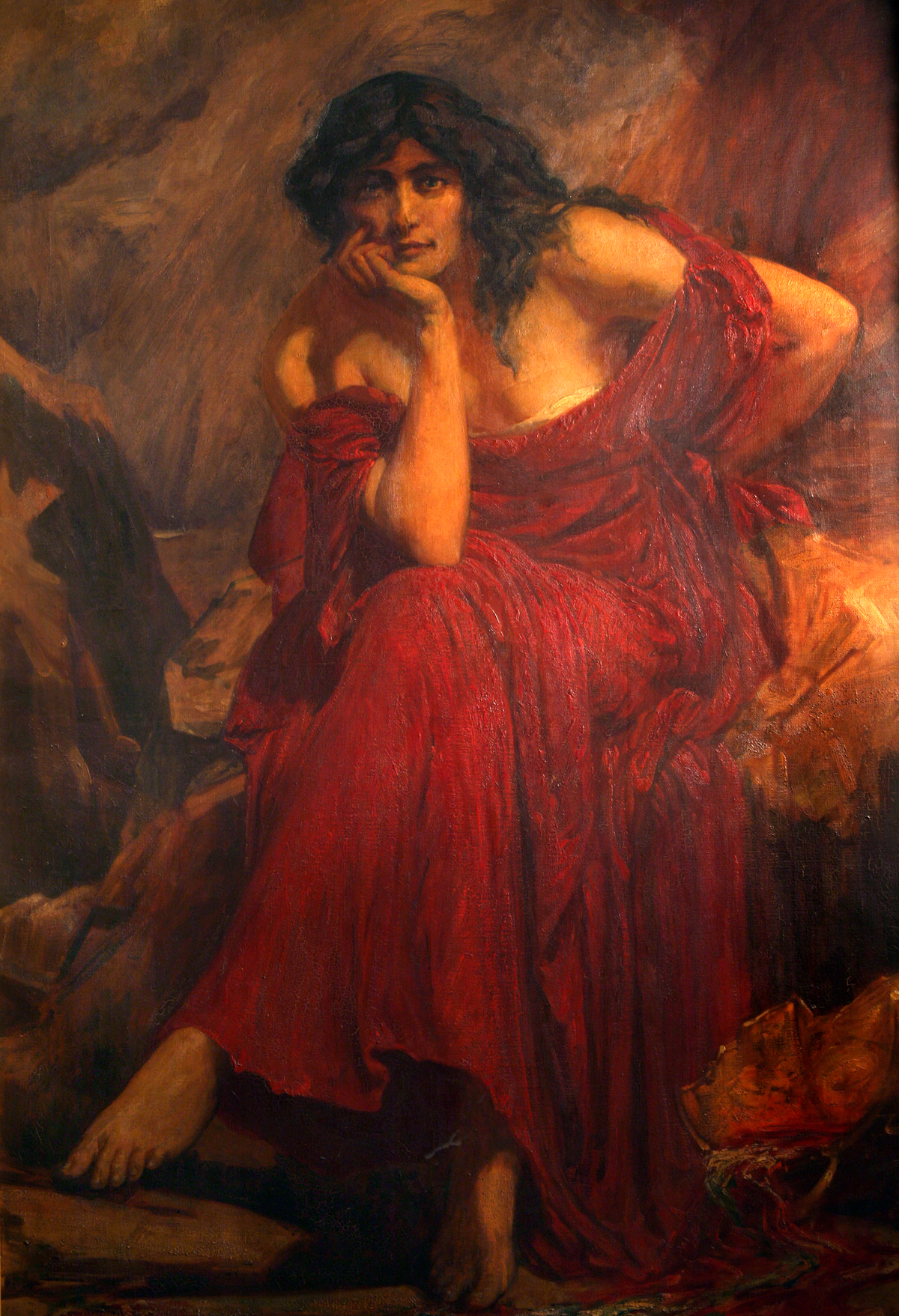
- Ceridwen by Christopher Williams, (1910)

Ceridwen or Cerridwen (pronounced [kɛrˈɪdwɛn] Ke-RID-wen) was an enchantress in Welsh medieval legend. She was the mother of a hideous son, Morfran, and a beautiful daughter, Creirwy. Her husband was Tegid Foel and they lived near Llyn Tegid (Bala Lake) in north Wales. Medieval Welsh poetry refers to her as possessing the cauldron of poetic inspiration (Awen) and the Tale of Taliesin recounts her swallowing her servant Gwion Bach who is then reborn through her as the poet Taliesin.

Ceridwen is regarded by many modern pagans as the Celtic goddess of rebirth, transformation, and inspiration.

== Etymology ==
Marged Haycock catalogues various forms of the name in the early texts, and in less detail in her edition of the Taliesin poems. These mainly occur in manuscripts which have been dated to the 13th century, though they may, of course, be using earlier forms or 13th century adaptations of earlier forms. The Black Book of Carmarthen gives ‘Kyrridven’. Peniarth 3 gives ‘Kyrrytuen’, The Book of Taliesin variously gives ‘Cerituen’, ‘Kerrituen’ and ‘Kerritwen’, while The Red Book of Hergest gives ‘Kerituen’. So ‘-fen’ is the most common termination (a mutated form of archaic ‘ben’ : ‘woman’). The variant forms ‘fen’, ‘uen’ and ‘ven’ are all due to variant scribal practices in the spelling of the sound in the modern letter ‘v’, as is the letter ‘w’, which was also sometimes used for this sound, causing the final syllable to be confused with ‘wen’ as a mutated form of Gwen (fair, blessed) a common ending to Welsh names. So ‘Ceridwen’ as a modern Welsh form of the name. Similarly, the difference between the ‘C’ and the ‘K’ initial consonant is clearly simply a matter of a different spelling convention to represent the hard ‘c’ sound. But the following vowel, ‘y’ or ‘e’ could well represent a shift in actual pronunciation of the vowel sound. Sir Ifor Williams asserted that ‘Cyrridfen’ is the most likely original form from ‘cwrr’ (bent, angled), so ‘woman with a crooked back’, fitting the stereotype of a witch. Marged Haycock accepts ‘ben’ but questions the first syllable as ‘cyr’, suggesting other possible alternatives which could relate to ‘crynu’ (shake or shiver), or ‘craid’ (passionate, fierce, powerful), but also notes her daughter Creirwy, with the first syllable a form of ‘credu’ (belief) and so, by analogy, her mother’s name as Credidfen would mean ‘woman to be believed in’, making the mother’s and daughter’s name stems a pair.

The earliest poems emphasise her keeping of the cauldron of awen and so a source of poetic inspiration. Cuhelyn Fardd (1100-1130) spoke of being inspired by her muse, while Cynddelw Prydydd Mawr (1155-1200) acknowledged her as the source of his art and Prydydd y Moch at the beginning of the 13th century specifically mentions the cauldron of Kyridfen as the source of the gift of awen. These and other references by identified bards are in addition to the many references by unidentified bards in The Book of Taliesin.

== Legend ==
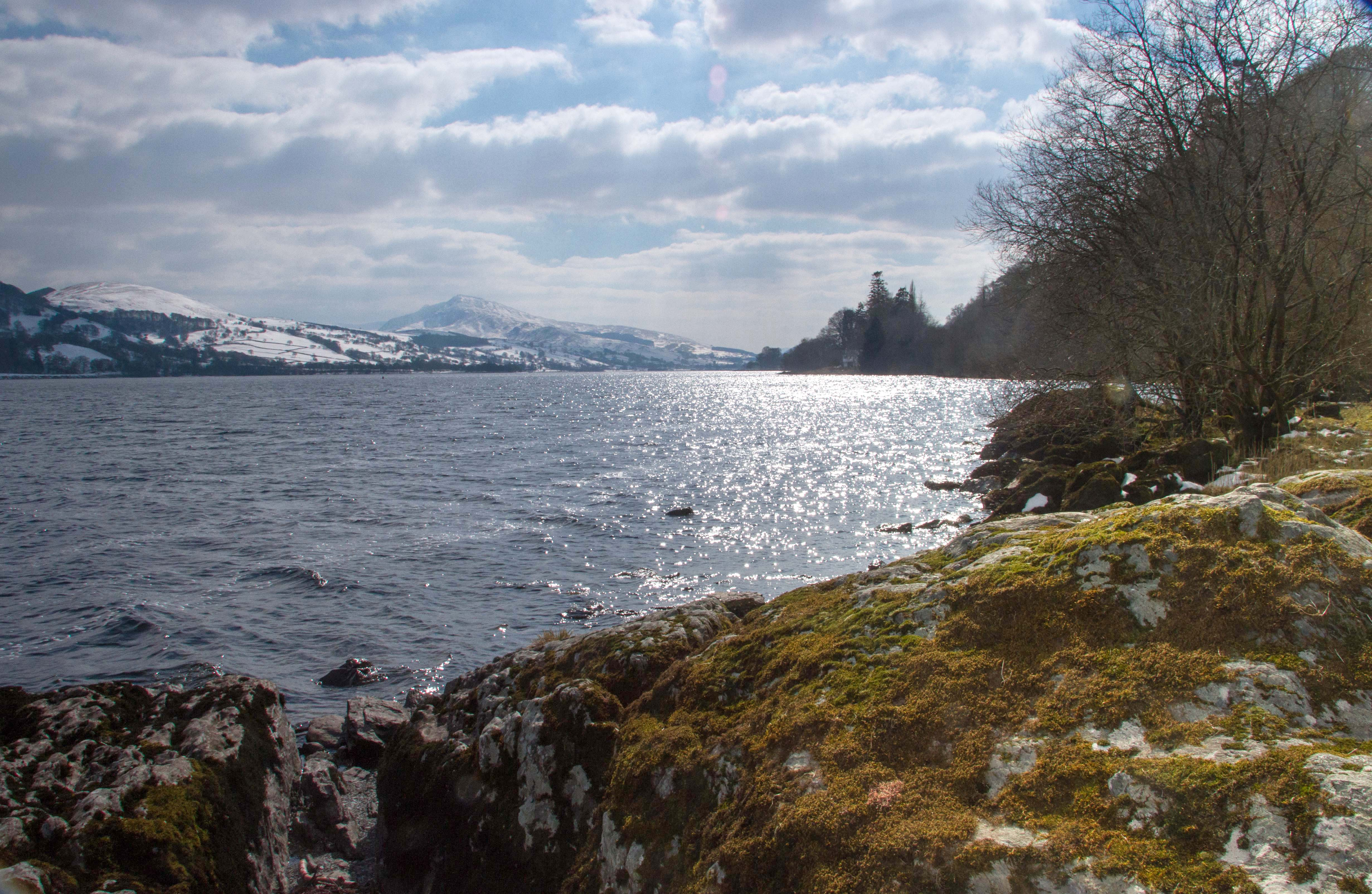
Ceridwen and her husband, Tegid Foel are associated with the lake Llyn Tegid, where they are said to have held their court until it was drowned beneath the waters in a single evening. According to the legend, the lights of the court and the little town around it are still visible on moonlit nights.

This story is first attested in a sixteenth-century manuscript written by Elis Gruffydd who claimed that it was widely known in Wales at that time in both written versions and in oral lore

The story tells that Ceridwen's son, Morfran (also called Afagddu), was hideously ugly – particularly compared with his beautiful sister Creirwy – so Ceridwen sought to make him wise in compensation. She made a potion in her magical cauldron to grant the gift of wisdom and poetic inspiration, also called Awen.

The mixture had to be boiled for a year and a day. She set Morda, a blind man, to tend the fire beneath the cauldron, while Gwion Bach, a young boy, stirred the concoction. The first three drops of liquid from this potion gave wisdom; the rest was a fatal poison. Three hot drops spilled onto Gwion's thumb as he stirred, burning him. He instinctively put his thumb in his mouth, and gained the wisdom and knowledge Ceridwen had intended for her son. Realising that Ceridwen would be angry, Gwion fled. Ceridwen chased him. Using the powers of the potion he turned himself into a hare. She became a greyhound. He became a fish and jumped into a river. She transformed into an otter. He turned into a bird; she became a hawk. Finally, he turned into a single grain of corn. She then became a hen and, being a goddess (or enchantress, depending on the version of the tale), she found and ate him without trouble. But because of the potion he was not destroyed. When Ceridwen became pregnant, she knew it was Gwion and resolved to kill the child when he was born. However, when he was born, he was so beautiful that she could not do it. She threw him in the ocean instead, sewing him inside a leather-skin bag (or set him in a coracle, depending on the story). The child did not die, but was rescued on a Welsh shore – near Aberdyfi according to most versions of the tale – by a prince named Elffin ap Gwyddno; the reborn infant grew to become the legendary bard Taliesin.

== Interpretation as a Goddess ==
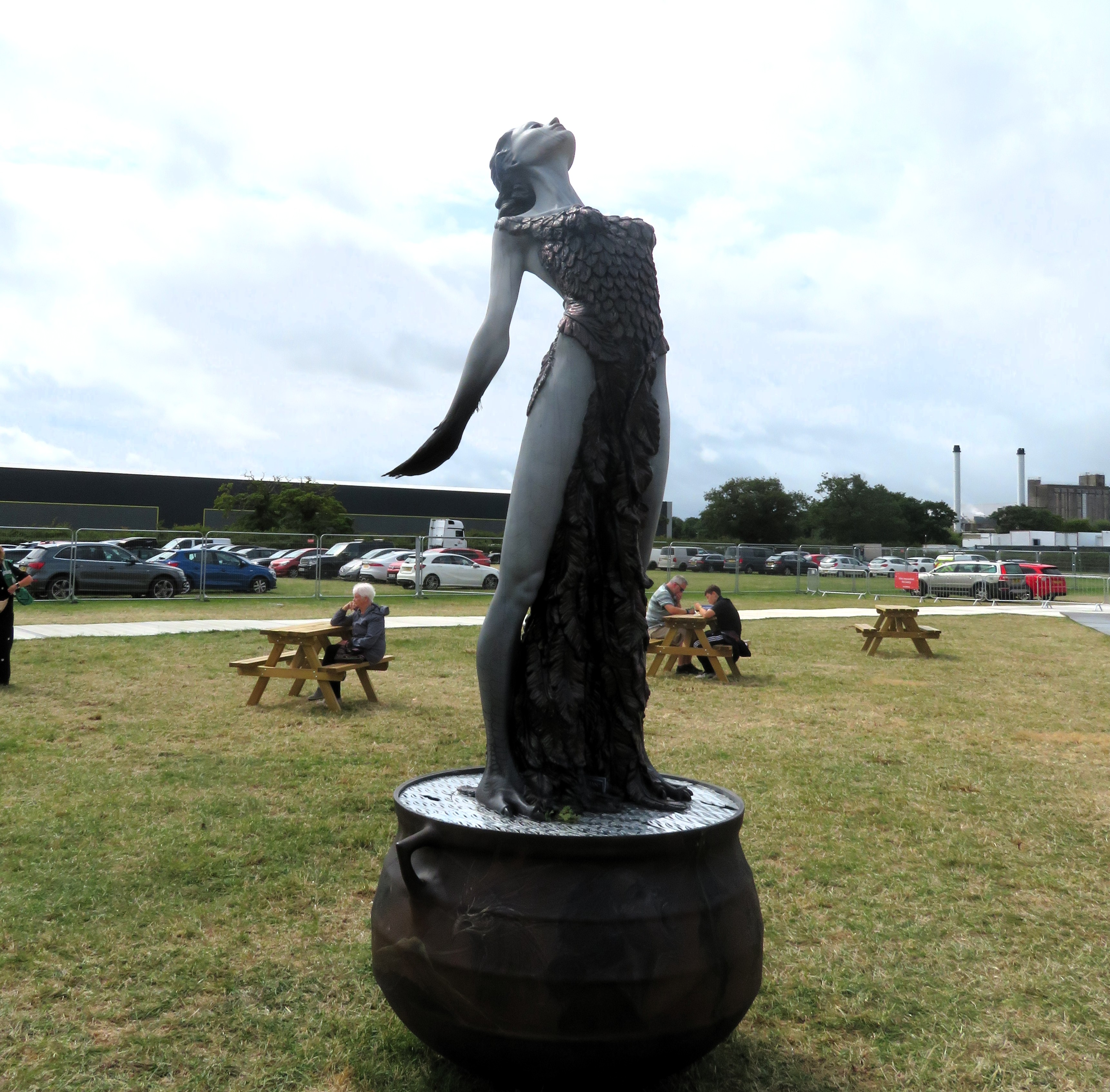
Sculpture of Ceridwen by Sam Holland at the 2025 National Eisteddfod in Wrexham

While the earliest surviving version of the Hanes Taliesin date from the mid-16th century, references to Ceridwen's magic cauldron (pair Ceridwen) are found in the 14th century Book of Taliesin, with the poems attributed to the historical Taliesin sometime in the 6th century. As such, many later writers have suggested that the Ceridwen of Medieval Welsh literature derives from an ancient pagan Celtic Goddess.

In 1829 the poet Thomas Love Peacock wrote a poem entitled the Cauldron of Ceridwen drawing on the Hanes Taliesin. Peacock's version of the Ceridwen legend treats her less like a hostile sorceress and like something approaching a Goddess, even being viewed are something of a protector by Taliesin.

In 1851 Esther Le Hardy described Ceridwen as a euhemerised ruler, while other writers identified her as having originated as a pagan Goddess. In 1878, following the comparative philology methods of his Oxford colleague Max Müller, John Rhŷs argued that several figures in Welsh mythology were anthropomorphised elements of nature. Through his study of the narratives around her, Rhŷs identified linguistic remnants of what he saw as solar and meteorological cycles. As such Rhŷs identified Ceridwen as a Dawn Goddess in an original Celtic Pantheon.

Ceridwen's status as a diety was again reinterpreted by Iolo Morgannwg in his attempt to establish that the ancient pagan religion of the Druids was monotheistic and therefore a precursor to Christianity. Iolo viewed the shape-shifting chase between Ceridwen and Gwion Bach as an allegory on how a soul transmigrates through various animal forms to purify itself before reaching enlightenment, with Ceridwen's Cauldron representing the womb of nature and the crucible of the soul. As such, Iolo shifted Ceridwen from a mythological diety to an allegory of nature and artistic creativity who was not herself a diety. However, Iolo's collection of work known as the Barddas would have a profound impact on Modern Druidry and Wicca, with many modern pagans viewing Ceridwen as a "Mother Goddess of Inspiration". Charles Isaac Elton in 1882 referred to her as a "white fairy". Robert Graves later fitted her into his concept of the Threefold Goddess, in which she was interpreted as a form of the destructive side of the goddess.

However, Ronald Hutton noted that the Ceridwen found in the Gogynfeirdd or Poets of the Princes (such as Cynddelw Brydydd Mawr) is transformed from a literary creation and sorceress into a Goddess connected to motherhood and nature by speculative "back-projections" of the 19th century. According to Hutton the Gogynfeirdd created a new substantial mythology that did not reflect any form of earlier paganism.

== See also ==
- Finn MacCool and the legend of the Salmon of Knowledge
- Fáfnismál
