= Tegid Foel =

Husband of Ceridwen in Welsh mythology

Tegid Foel is the husband of Ceridwen in Welsh mythology. His name rendered into English would be "Tacitus the Bald". In folklore, Tegid Foel is associated with Llyn Tegid in Gwynedd and may have been the tutelary deity of that lake.

Tegid Foel is known chiefly from the story of Taliesin's birth, first recorded in full in the 16th century but dating to a much earlier period. According to the story, he lived by Llyn Tegid in the region of Penllyn with his wife, the sorceress Ceridwen. Together they had two children, a beautiful daughter named Creirwy and a son Morfran, called Afagddu ("utter darkness") because of his dark skin and hideous looks. Tegid's name is mentioned several times in Welsh literature in the patronymic of his more famous son Mofran; it appears in the Mabinogion tales Culhwch and Olwen and The Dream of Rhonabwy, and in Welsh Triads 24 and 41. Apart from Creirwy and Morfran the Welsh genealogies also name other children of Tegid. The Vitae Sanctorum Britanniae et Genealogiae gives the following lineage: "Afan Buellt son of Cedig son of Ceredig son of Cunedda Wledig by Degfed ["Tenth"] daughter of Tegid Foel"; Rawlins MS B gives another genealogy naming another daughter, Dwywai.
