= Adder stone =

Naturally-occurring stone with a hole through it

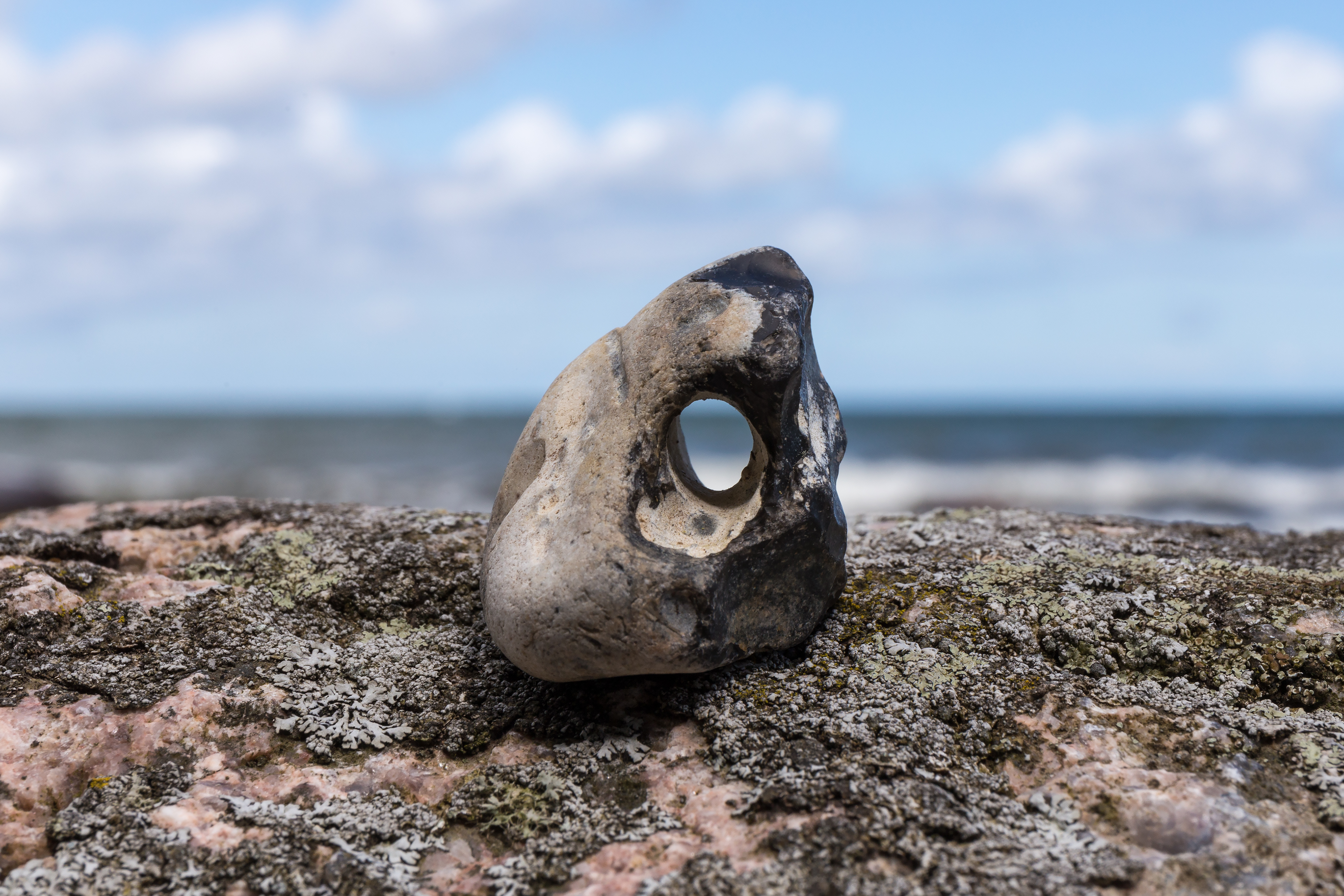
An adder stone found near Lohme, Germany, in the Baltic Sea

An adder stone is a type of stone, usually glassy, with a naturally occurring hole through it. Such stones, which usually consist of flint, have been discovered by archaeologists in both Britain and Egypt. Commonly, they are found in Northern Germany at the coasts of the North and Baltic Seas.

In Britain they are also called hag stones, witch stones, fairy stones, serpent's eggs, snake's eggs, or Glain Neidr in Wales, milpreve in Cornwall, adderstanes in the south of Scotland and Gloine nan Druidh ("Druids' glass" in Scottish Gaelic) in the north. In Germany they are called Hühnergötter ("chicken gods").

Various traditions exist as to the origins of adder stones. One holds that the stones are the hardened saliva of large numbers of serpents massing together, the perforations being caused by their tongues. There are other claims that an adder stone comes from the head of a serpent or is made by the sting of an adder. The more modern and perhaps easier to attain artefact would be any rock with a hole bored through the middle by water. Stones shaped by human intervention (i.e., direction of water or placement of the stone) are not considered adder stones which are formed naturally.

== In Pliny's Natural History ==
According to Ancient Roman natural philosopher Pliny’s Natural History, book XXIX, adder stone was held in high esteem amongst the Druids. Pliny described rituals the druids allegedly conducted to acquire the stone, and the magical properties they ascribed to it. He wrote:

... there is another kind of egg, held in high renown by the people of the Gallic provinces, but totally omitted by the Greek writers. In summer time, numberless snakes become artificially entwined together, and form rings around their bodies with the viscous slime which exudes from their mouths, and with the foam secreted by them: the name given to this substance is anguinum. The Druids tell us, that the serpents eject these eggs into the air by their hissing, and that a person must be ready to catch them in a cloak, so as not to let them touch the ground; they say also that he must instantly take to flight on horseback, as the serpents will be sure to pursue him, until some intervening river has placed a barrier between them. The test of its genuineness, they say, is its floating against the current of a stream, even though it be set in gold. But, as it is the way with magicians to be dexterous and cunning in casting a veil about their frauds, they pretend that these eggs can only be taken on a certain day of the moon; as though, forsooth, it depended entirely upon the human will to make the moon and the serpents accord as to the moment of this operation.

I myself, however, have seen one of these eggs: it was round, and about as large as an apple of moderate size; the shell of it was formed of a cartilaginous substance, and it was surrounded with numerous cupules, as it were, resembling those upon the arms of the polypus: it is held in high estimation among the Druids. The possession of it is marvellously vaunted as ensuring success in law-suits, and a favourable reception with princes; a notion which has been so far belied, that a Roman of equestrian rank, a native of the territory of the Vocontii, who, during a trial, had one of these eggs in his bosom, was slain by the late Emperor Tiberius, and for no other reason, that I know of, but because he was in possession of it.

== In Welsh mythology ==
The Glain Neidr or Maen Magi of Welsh folklore is also closely connected to Druidism. The Glain Neidr of Wales are believed to be created by a congress of snakes, normally occurring in spring, but most auspicious on May Eve.

Although not named as Glain Neidr, magic stones with the properties of adder stones appear frequently in Welsh mythology and folklore. The Mabinogion, translated into English in the mid-nineteenth century by Lady Charlotte Guest, mentions such stones on two occasions. In the story of Peredur son of Efrawg (Percival of the Arthurian cycle), in a departure from Chrétien de Troyes' Perceval, the Story of the Grail, Peredur is given a magical stone that allows him to see and kill an invisible creature called the Addanc. In another tale, Owain, or the Lady of the Fountain (Ywain of Arthurian legend), the hero Owain mab Urien is trapped in the gatehouse of a castle. He is given a stone by a maiden, which turns Owain invisible, allowing him to escape capture.

== In Russian mythology ==
In Russian folklore, adder stones were believed to be the abodes of spirits called Kurinyi Bog ("The Chicken God"). Kurinyi Bog were the guardians of chickens, and their stones were placed into farmyards to counteract the possible evil effects of the Kikimora (The wives of the Domovoi, the house spirits). Kikimora, who also guarded and took care of chickens, could often unleash misery upon hens they did not like by plucking out their feathers.

== In English folklore ==
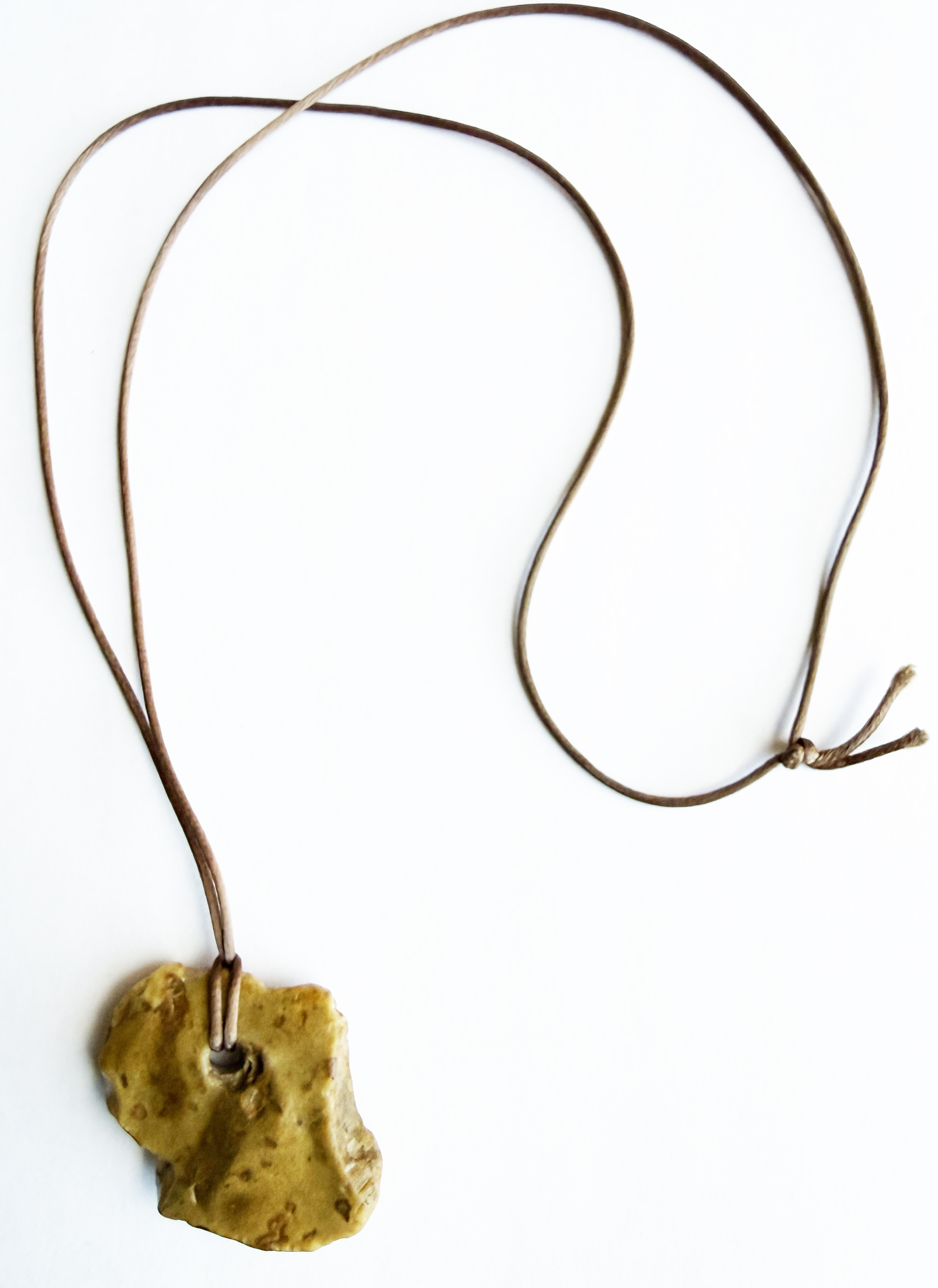
Flint adder stone found on the shore of the River Thames, hung on a silk cord

In various British folklore traditions, adder stones were associated with magical powers, especially if hung by a string. A common early belief, attested from at least the 15th century, was that hanging a stone over a person or horses could prevent nightmares in them. For instance, in his 1584 work The Discoverie of Witchcraft, Reginald Scot gives the following cure for "The mare":

Item, hang a stone over the afflicted persons bed, which stone hath naturallie such a hole in it, as wherein a string may be put through it, and so be hanged over the diseased or bewitched partie; be it man, woman, or horsse.

Several sources suggest that the talisman works best if used concurrently with a spoken or written charm about Saint George. Thomas Blundeville, citing his source as "an olde English wryter" and suggesting that it "may perhappes make you gentle reader to laugh", writes of the practice in the section "Of the night Mare" in a 1565 text on horsemanship, recording the advice of taking "a Flynte stone that hath a hole of its owne kinde" and hanging it above a horse, along with the following verse written on paper:

In nomine patris. &c.
Saint George our Laydes knyght,
He walked day so did he night,
Untill he her founde,
He her beate and he her bounde,
Till truly he trouth she hym plyght,
That she woulde not come within the night,
There as Saynt George our Ladyes Knight
Named was three tymes, Saint George.

Sources suggest that this practice continued into the 20th century. Edward Lovett in a 1928 study of folklore in Surrey and Sussex reported that "The favourite objects for this purpose [warding off nightmares] are horse shoes and natural perforated stones which latter, by the way, are quite common the beach at Brighton... The holed stones are in most cases on a loop of red ribbon, or string, etc., and are occasionally simply hooked on to one of the knobs of the bedstead."

Other sources report that adder stones were sometimes considered general-purpose good luck talismans. A woman in Essex in 1984 was reported to have told researchers, "I still keep stones with holes in them on my window-sill for luck. I used to pick them up as a child from the beach in South Shields, and all my family still pick them up—because we think they're lucky."

In the seaside town Hastings there is a local legend that the town is under an enchantment known as Crowley's Curse, said to have been conjured by Aleister Crowley who lived in Hastings at the end of his life. The curse compels anyone who has lived in Hastings to always return, no matter how far away they move, or for how long. The curse can only be broken by taking a stone with a hole running through it from Hastings beach.

== See also ==
- Creirwy
- Druid
- List of mythological objects
- Omarolluk and Pholad borings, other rocks with curious but naturally created holes.
- Toadstone
- Paramoudra
