= William James Clarke =

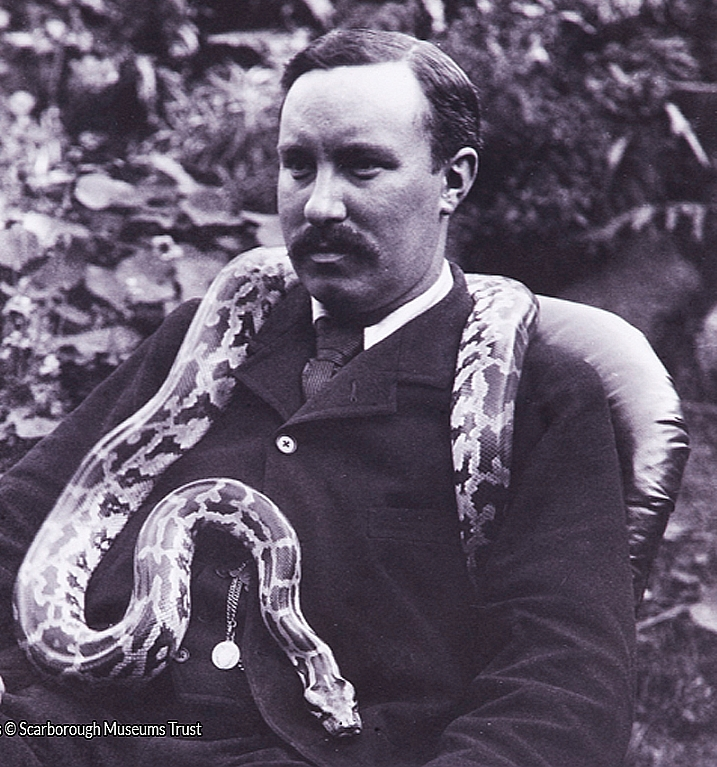
- Clarke in 1900 with a pet python
- Born: 1871
- Died: 22 October 1945 (aged 73–74)
- Occupations: shopkeeper, taxidermist, museum curator

William James Clarke FZS (1871– 22 October 1945) was a naturalist and folklorist from Scarborough in North Riding of Yorkshire. He was the keeper of a fishing tackle shop, a taxidermist and a dealer in natural history requisites. For some years he worked as a curator of the Rotunda Museum in Scarborough.

== Biography ==
Clarke was born in Scarborough where his father Richard ran Clarke's Aerated Waters and Bottling Company, founded in 1889. He went to Miss Mary Graham's nursery and Mr Wheater's grammar school. He became interested in natural history after a meeting with George Massee, joining the latter's naturalists' club at the Unitarian Church in 1880. He then studied at Frederick York Richmond's school where Clarke set up an aquarium and museum. At the age of 12 he gave a talk on reptiles at the Grand Hotel to raise funds for the Union Jack Field Club of the school. He later joined the Scarborough Field Naturalists Society, presiding over it in 1894. He apprenticed at a printing press and later started a store dealing with natural history specimens on 44 Huntriss Row. Apart from natural history, he also took an interest in charms and amulets and began to collect them.

He was a curator at the Rotunda Museum from 1913 to 1915 and gave away his collections to the museum after his death. Clarke found a giant squid which was found on the beach on 14 January 1933 which was described as a new species Architeuthis clarkei by G.C. Robson although that name is now treated as a synonym.

== Naturalist ==
As a boy Clarke was "a lover of natural history, and he alarmed his master by taking frogs, toads and grass snakes in his pockets to business. Later in life for many years he kept and carefully recorded the habits of two large snakes, a python and a boa-constrictor, which he always said got to know him."

In 1892 he joined the Yorkshire Naturalists' Union. At the age of 23, W.J. Clarke became the president of the Scarborough Field Naturalists Society in 1894. The next year he worked as the secretary. From 1902 he was a Fellow of the Zoological Society of London.

During his life Clarke made many contributions to The Naturalist. He also contributed to The Zoologist.

== Folklorist ==
Apart from his interests in natural history, Clarke was also a folklorist, more especially a collector of charms, and amulets. His collection of charms in the Scarborough museum is still "one of the most intriguing held within the Scarborough Collections, due to the breadth of material represented and the insight it offers into past people's lives based on their belief system, fears and hopes."

The heyday of folklore collecting in Britain started around 1900. Edward Lovett was one of the renowned collectors, with whom Clarke was in close contact. Clarke's collection held charms, that were "said to bring 'good luck', 'good fortune', or specific advantages–such as abundance, love, strength, protection, success in gambling, long life, fertility, and safety in childbirth or war." The amulets in the collection were "expected to repel the evil eye, witches, demons and nightmares, sickness and discomfort (ranging from venereal disease to loose teeth), and to guard against fire, flood, theft, and hunger, travel accidents, drowning, and being struck by lightning."

== Bibliography ==
- Clarke, W.J. (1898). "Notes from Scarborough". The Zoologist. 4th series, vol 2 (issue 679, January—section 'Notes and Queries'): 28.
- Clarke, W.J.; Robson, G.C. (1929). "Notes on the stranding of giant squids on the north-east coast of England". Proceedings of the Malacological Society. 18 (4): 154–158. doi:10.1093/oxfordjournals.mollus.a063962. (with a map)
- Clarke, W.J. (1933). "Giant squid (new to science) at Scarborough". The Naturalist. 58 (691): 157–158. (with 1 photo)
- —— (1939). "Giant squid near Scarborough". The Naturalist. 64 (691): 136–137. (with 1 photo) (Reprinted: —— (1939). "Giant squid near Scarborough". Journal of Conchology. 21 (6): 163–164. Bibcode:1939JConc..21..163C. doi:10.5962/p.406884.)
- Clarke, W.J. (1939). "Varieties of Mallard at Scarborough". The Naturalist. 64 (691): 137–138. (with 1 photo)
- —— (1940). "The Jubilee Anniversary of the Scarborough Field Naturalists' Society". The Naturalist. 65 (771): 67–68.
- —— (1944). "A List of Yorkshire Marine Fishes". The Naturalist. 69 (810): 97–106.

== Sources ==
- Birkhead, T. R.; Axon, G.; Middleton, J. R. (2020). "Restoration of two great auk ( Pinguinus impennis ) eggs: Bourman Labrey's egg and the Scarborough egg". Archives of Natural History. 47 (2): 392–401. doi:10.3366/anh.2020.0663. ISSN 0260-9541. S2CID 229482068.
- Cadbury, Tabitha (2012). "The charms of Scarborough, London, etc.: the collecting networks of Charles Clarke and Edward Lovett". Journal of Museum Ethnography. 25 (25): 119–137. ISSN 0954-7169. JSTOR 41710657.
- Cross, E. R. (1946). "In Memoriam. W. J. Clarke, F.Z.S." The Naturalist (816): 19–20.
- Cultiv8 (Scarborough Museums Trust) (3 November 2011). "Who was William James Clarke?". Cultiv8 – Scarborough Museums Trust's Youth Panel. Archived from the original on 22 May 2023.
