= JATO (disambiguation) =

JATO (jet-assisted take-off) refers to the use of rockets to provide additional thrust for starting aircraft.

Jato or JATO It may also refer to:

- Jato (grinder), a form of grain grinder made of stone and used in Himalayan regions
- JATO Dynamics, a company that collects data about the automotive industry

== See also ==
- NATO, a military alliance
