= Rock cupule =

Artificial depression in rock

Cupules
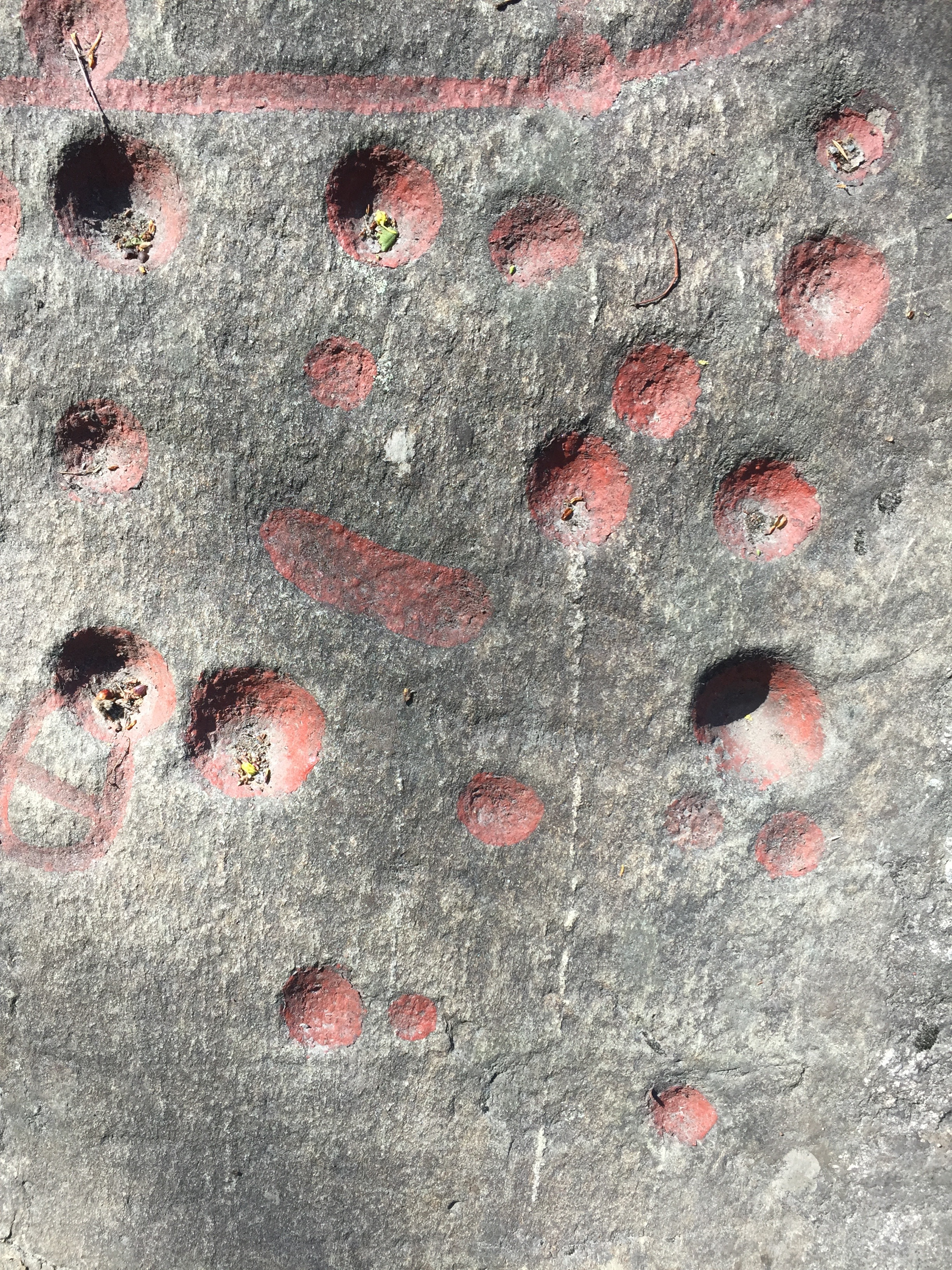
- Cup marks at the Slagsta petroglyph outside Stockholm, Sweden
- Material: Rock
- Size: Between 1.5 and 10 cm in diameter
- Present location: Every continent except Antarctica

Rock cupules (/ˈkjuːpjuːl/) are artificially made depressions on rock surfaces that resemble the shape of an inverse spherical cap or dome. They were made by direct percussion with hand-held hammer-stones, on vertical, sloping or horizontal rock surfaces. Cupules are widely believed to be the world's most common rock art motifs, found in huge numbers in every continent except Antarctica. They were produced in many cultures, from the Lower Paleolithic to the 20th century, and they can be found on most lithologies. Similar artifacts from lithic Native American cultures are also known as cupstones.

The word cupule comes from the Late Latin cūpula, meaning "little cask".

== Appearances ==
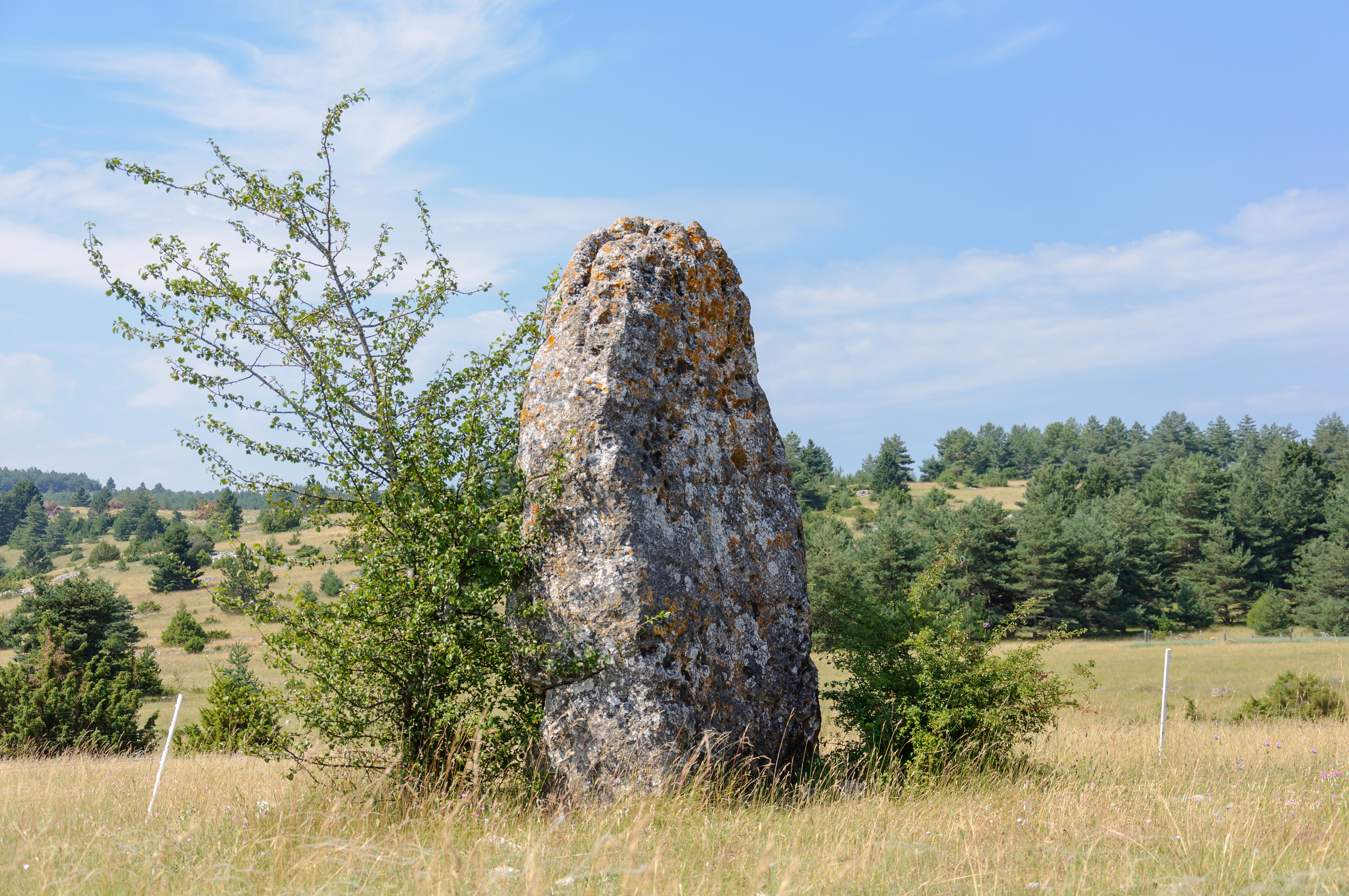
The Fraïsse menhir on Causse Méjean (Mas-Saint-Chély, Lozère, France), marked with cupules

Cupules are usually between 1.5 and 10 centimetres (0.6 and 4 in) in diameter, although larger specimens are occasionally seen. They occur commonly in groupings that may number several hundred; they may be arranged in geometric formations, such as aligned sets, or they occur in unstructured, random groups.

Some specimens in the southern Kalahari Desert are suggested to be in the order of 410,000 years old, and those of two sites in central India should be even earlier. In Middle Paleolithic or Middle Stone Age contexts, cupules occur in Africa and Australia, and are attributable to that era also in Europe. They seem to become less common in the course of the European Upper Paleolithic, but still occur occasionally. Cupules are extremely common in the Neolithic and the Metal Ages of Europe, Asia and Africa, and in medieval Europe.

== Purpose ==
Little is definitely known about the purpose or significance of cupules. Many meanings or purposes have been suggested in the literature (one review lists 71). In a number of cases cupules were demonstrated to mark specific rocks used as lithophones; in some cases they served in board games; but other credible ethnographic interpretations of their former cultural functions have been secured in very few instances. These cannot necessarily be extrapolated to other corpora, which are widely separated temporally as well as spatially. Even the identification of cupules remains tenuous: archaeologists have encountered difficulties in distinguishing cupules from other features, such as potholes, mortars, querns, metates, piedras tacitas, and small solution pans.

== Creation ==
Typically cupules were created by direct percussion, i.e. using hand-held hammer-stones. Replication studies have shown that the time required for their production varies greatly, depending on the rock type. It can take one minute to create a 12 mm deep cupule on weathered sandstone, but 45,000 and 60,000 hammer-stone strokes on unweathered quartzite. The resistance of a rock to kinetic impact is determined by its hardness, toughness and strength. Hardness, in this context, is a complex articulation of several factors, essentially a measure of how resistant rock is to various kinds of permanent shape change when a compressive force is applied to it. These factors include scratch or abrasion resistance (Rosiwal scale), toughness, strength, ductility, indentation hardness (measured by the Brinell scale and expressed in BHN, or measured by the Vickers test and expressed in kg/mm^{2}) and brittleness factor. Abrasion hardness, indentation hardness and brittleness factor (ratio of the uniaxial compressive strength and the uniaxial tensile strength) combine to determine the “composite hardness index” θ, which governs the production coefficient ρ:

ρ = V θ²

The approximate cupule volume V is determined by:

V = π × d × (R² + r² + R × r) / 3

in which r = mean radius at rim and d = cupule depth. The mean radius is close to half the sum of two radii measured at right angles to each other. The kinetic energy applied in the production of cupules can be determined experimentally, kinetic energy Ek being the ability of a mass in motion to have a physical effect:

Ek = M v²

in which M = quantity of mass in motion, v = velocity in straight line. It amounts to tens of kilo-Newtons in the case of unweathered quartzite. This cumulative application of focused force has occasionally led to kinetic energy metamorphosis in sedimentary siliceous rocks, a phenomenon first identified in cupules but since recognized in many geological contexts.
