= Omarolluk =

Feature found in sedimentary rocks

Omars in Hudson Bay, Nunavut

Omars are a distinctive type of glacial erratic that consists of dark siliceous greywacke and exhibits prominent rounded, often deep, hemispherical voids and pits. The hemispherical voids and pits result from the selective dissolution of carbonate concretions within the greywacke. The greywacke is identifiable by its low metamorphic grade and the 10–40% rock fragments, distinctive volcanic clasts, and spherical carbonate concretions that it contains. Omars are typically rounded and range in size from pebbles to boulders. Their rounded shape, whether found in glacial tills or glacial-fluvial (outwash) gravels, indicate that they were eroded from pre-existing littoral or fluvial deposits. Omars are typically found associated with granules and pebbles of oolitic jasper that were transported from the Belcher Islands in Hudson Bay, Canada.

The name given these glacial erratics refer to their source, which is the Proterozoic Omarolluk Formation in the Belcher Islands in southeast Hudson Bay. The Laurentide Ice Sheet eroded omars from the Belcher Islands, an archipelago limited to only about a quarter of 1% of Hudson Bay. Glaciers moved omars from the southeastern part of Hudson Bay to central Canada and into the U.S. where they were deposited on moraines. Because scientists know precisely where they came from they are very valuable in documenting the movement of glaciers.

== Etymology ==
There is uncertainty on how to translate the proper name Omarolluk (and omar rocks). According to the records of the Canada Centre for Mapping and Earth Observation Natural Resources, the features Omarolluk Sound and Omarolluk Formation were named after Omarolluk, an Inuk man who accompanied and guided R. J. Flaherty on numerous geological surveys of the Belcher Islands and elsewhere in the Canadian north. He was probably an Inuktitut-dialect speaker from the eastern coast of Hudson Bay. The spelling likely varied from the originally pronounced but unrecorded aural form of the name. Despite the expected natural-feature designations, Omarolluk was surely an actual person. There are three possible translations, as follows: (1) Best: In the subdialect (Itivimiut) of the Nunavik dialect of Inuktitut, the phoneme /j/ was and still is up to a point pronounced more or less like English r and generally transcribed as such, and so the name in the standard Canadian Inuit spelling might have been *Uumajurluk (pronounced /uumaruRluk/: r = English r; R = French r), that is, ‘bad animal’ (uumajuq ‘animal’; luk ‘bad’) as a guess. (2) Somewhat similar but possibly: ‘poor reason for being alive’, uumaq-jjut-luk ‘be.alive–reason.for/cause.for–bad/poor’ (-jjut takes the form -rut after the uvular [q] and then deletes it, at least in the contemporary language). The initial o is dubious for an expected u. (3) A distant Yup’ik possibility if applied to a rock stratum: Umaq is a seam between the upper and lower parts of a kamik (sealskin boot); the ruq part would mean ‘to become’, and luk is the ‘it’, thus imperfectly ‘it becomes a seam’, but if umaaq, then it becomes ‘rip (at the seam)’, a verb, which would mean something like ‘it has a habit of ripping at the seam’.

== See also ==
- Adder stone, Eurasian natural rocks with holes
- Cupstone, true Native American artifacts
- Pholad borings, similar rock holes caused by certain types of bivalves
- Lithic technology
