= Shieling =

Dwelling on a pasture high in the hills

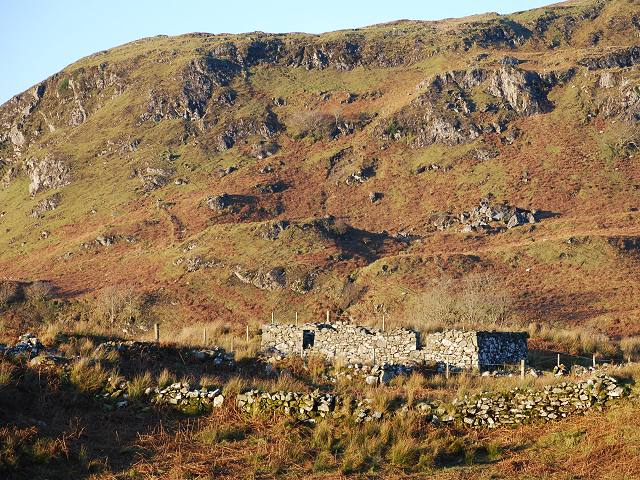
Ruined shieling south of Oban

A shieling (Note: Also spelt sheiling, shealing, sheelin, and sheeling.) (Scottish Gaelic: àirigh) is a hut on a seasonal cattle pasture high in the hills, once common in upland or rural places in Scotland. Oval, circular or rectangular on plan, they were often constructed of dry stone or turf, with a small doorway and without any window openings. More loosely, the term may denote a seasonal mountain pasture for the grazing of cattle in summer. Seasonal pasturage implies transhumance between the shieling and a valley settlement in winter. Many Scottish songs have been written about life in shielings, often concerning courtship and love. The ruins of shielings are a relatively common feature in upland Scotland, particularly the Highlands and many are depicted on Ordnance Survey maps.

== Etymology ==
A "shieling" is a summer dwelling on a seasonal pasture high in the hills. The first recorded use of the term is from 1568. The word "shieling" comes from "shiel", from the forms schele or shale in the Northern dialect of Middle English, likely related to Old Frisian skul meaning "hiding place" and to Old Norse skjol meaning "shelter" and skali meaning "hut".

== Seasonal dwelling ==
=== Construction ===
Plans of three different shielings, of increasing complexity. Shielings were mostly rectangular although often with rounded corners. Some had a single room, others two or three. There were few or no windows in the walls of turf or stone.

A shieling, whether an isolated dwelling or in a group, is a hut or small dwelling, usually in an upland area. Shielings were often constructed of locally available dry stone, or turf. They are mostly rectangular buildings between 5.7–14 metres (19–46 ft) long and 3–8.3 metres (9.8–27.2 ft) wide, although they may have rounded corners or be roughly oval. The rectangular buildings usually had gabled roofs covered in local materials such as turf, heather, or rushes, supported on timbers. The doorway was usually in the middle of one of the long sides of the building, often on the south side; it was often just a gap in the wall, although some shielings had door jambs and lintels made of larger blocks of stone. The smaller shielings consisted of a single room; most were divided into two or three rooms. There were few or no windows. Some sources consider shielings to differ from farmsteads in lacking an enclosure, although they may be surrounded by a bank and ditch, or by a dry stone wall.

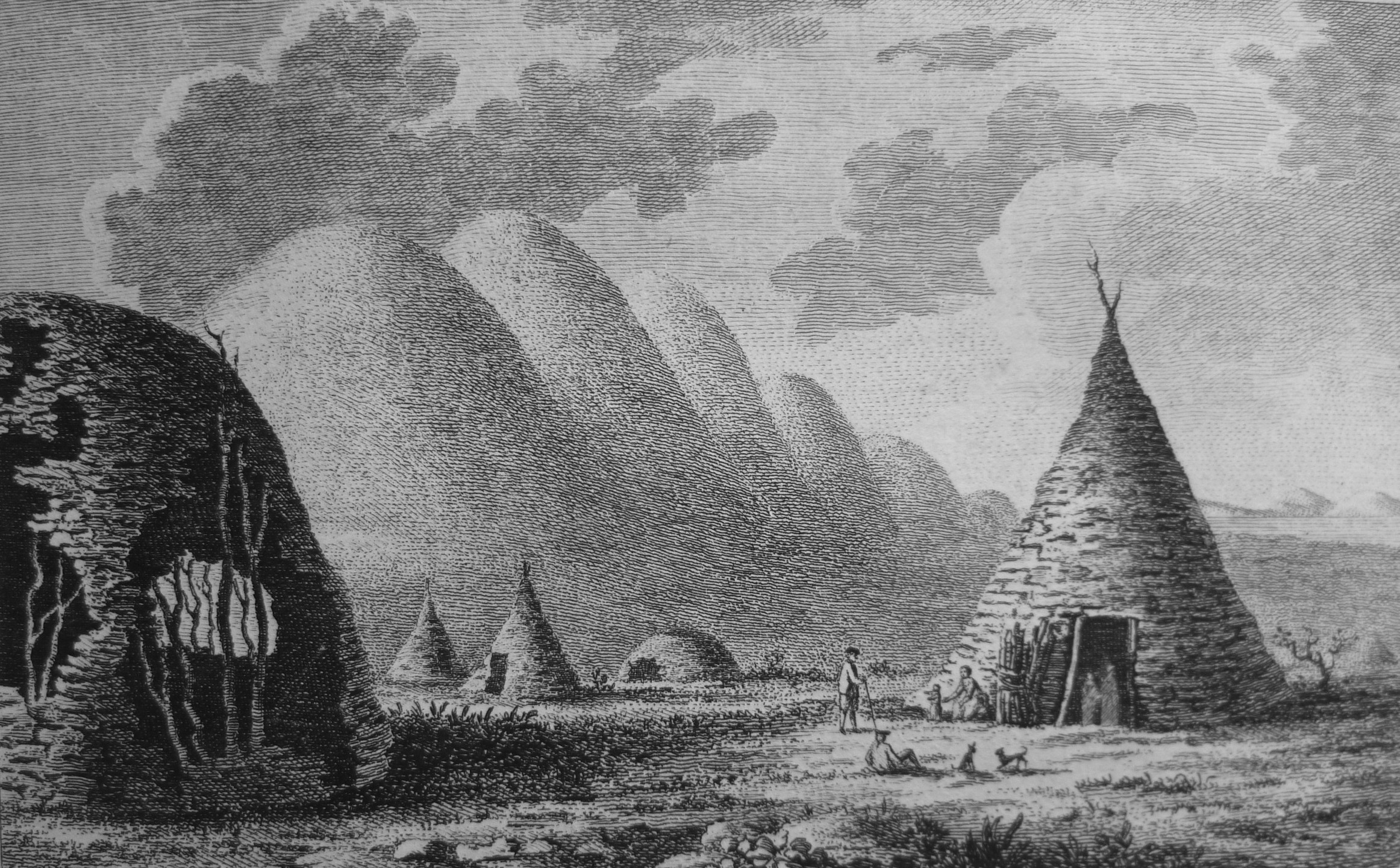
18th-century shielings on the isle of Jura, from Thomas Pennant's 1776 Voyage to the Hebrides

The Welsh traveller and naturalist Thomas Pennant wrote the first description of Scottish shielings:

I landed on a bank covered with sheelins, the temporary habitations of some peasants who tend the herds of milch cows. These formed a grotesque group; some were oblong, some conic, and so low that the entrance is forbidden without creeping through the opening, which has no other door than a faggot of birch twigs placed there occasionally; they are constructed of branches of trees covered with sods; the furniture a bed of heather; placed on a bank of sod, two blankets and a rug; some dairy vessels; and above, certain pendent shelves made of basket‑work, to hold the cheese, the product of the summer. In one of the little conic huts I spied a little infant asleep.

— Thomas Pennant, Voyage to the Hebrides, 1776

=== Usage ===
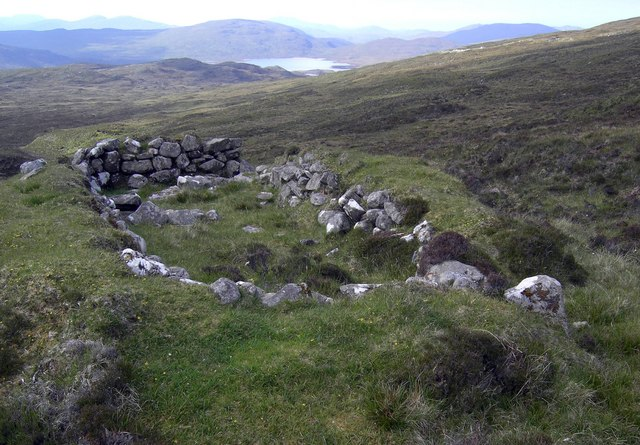
A ruined shieling close to the Loch Langavat path, Isle of Lewis

The shieling system was widespread across Europe, including upland Britain and Iceland. It survives into the 21st century in Norway, Northern Sweden and the higher areas of central Europe. Farmers and their families lived in shielings during the summer to enable their livestock to graze common land. Shielings were therefore associated with the transhumance system of agriculture. They were often beside streams, which were used as pathways into the hills, or at the far end of the upland grazing land from the migrants' winter dwellings. The mountain huts generally fell out of use by the end of the 17th century, although in remote areas, such as the Isle of Lewis in the Hebrides, this system continued into the 18th century or even later. Derek Cooper, in his 1983 book on Skye, writes that the buildings on the moors were repaired each summer when the people arrived with their cattle; they made butter and cheese, and gruthim, salted buttered curds.

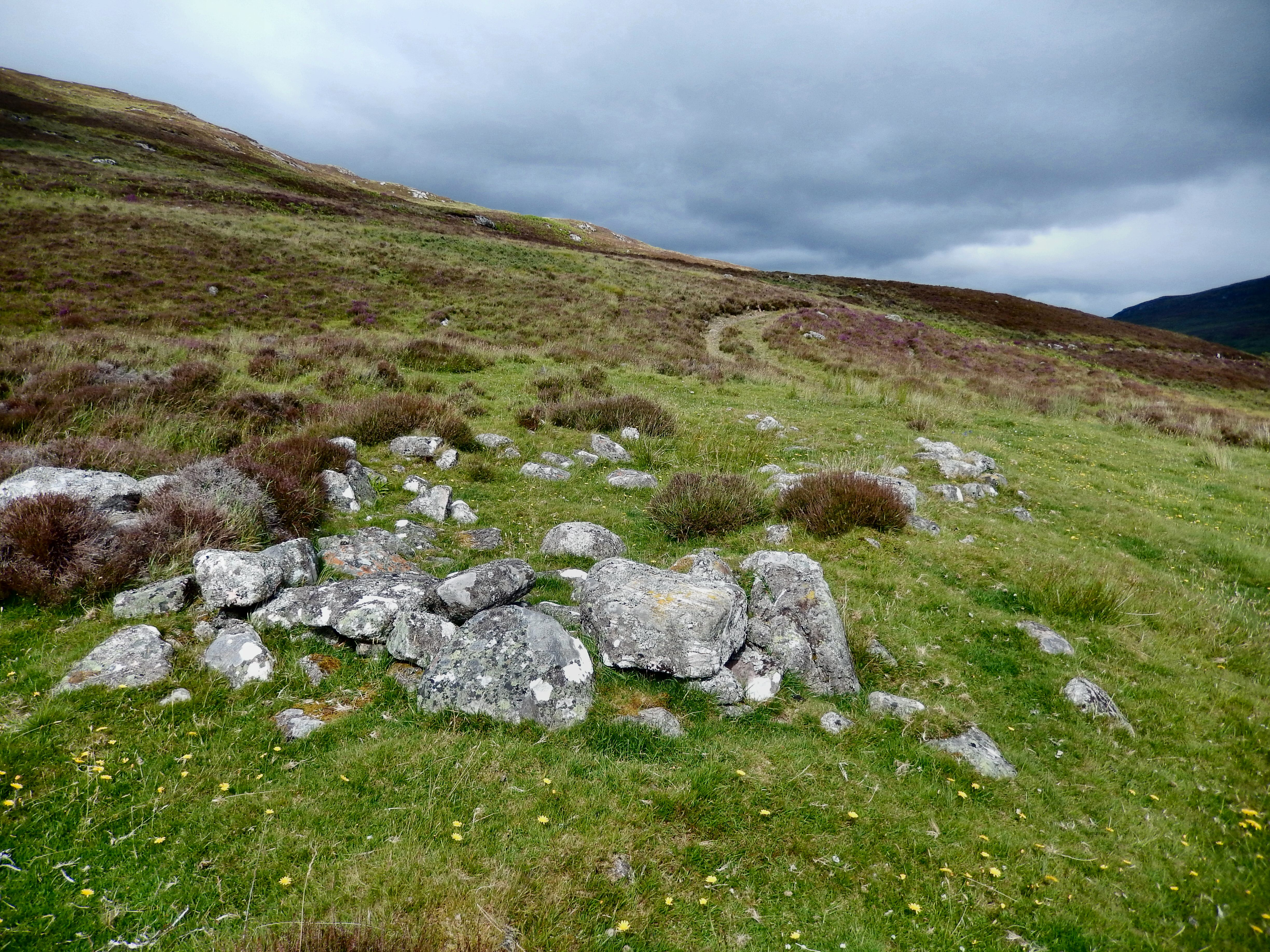
The scant ruins of a summer shieling at Catlodge, near Laggan, marked by a green area around the building where the land had been cleared, which contrasts with the heather moorland

Ruins of shielings are abundant in high or marginal land in Scotland and Northern England, as are place-names containing "shield" or their Gaelic equivalents, such as Pollokshields in Glasgow, Arinagour on the island of Coll, Galashiels in the Scottish Borders, and "Shiels Brae" near Bewcastle. Turf-built shielings have typically gradually eroded and disappeared, but traces of stone-built structures persist in the landscape. Some shielings are medieval in origin and were occasionally occupied permanently after the abandonment of the transhumance system. The construction of associated structures such as stack-stands (Note: These were small raised platforms to construct haystacks on, to keep the hay as dry as possible when there was no room to bring it inside the shieling.) and enclosures indicate that in these cases they became farmsteads, some of which evolved into contemporary farms.

=== Scottish shieling songs ===
Many Scottish songs have been written about life in shielings, often concerning courtship and love. Several of these are in Alexander Macdonald's 1914 Story and Song from Loch Ness-side, including "Cha teid mi Choir Odhar", "Chunacas gruagach ‘s an aonach", and "A fhlesgaich is cummaire", all from Perthshire, and "Luinneag Airidh" (a shieling lovesong). The song "Chunacas gruagach 's an aonach" includes the lines

"Many times often you and I,
Have been at the shieling (Note: The word used in the original song here is Scottish Gaelic: àirigh.) on Brae Rannoch.
On the hillock of the waterfall,
Where we were resting.
In the bothy of the dalliance,
With a brushwood screen for door.
My mouth placed on your fragrant mouth,
And my hand would be round you, my love."

The song is similar to the famous "Bothan Àirigh am Bràigh Raithneach" (The Shieling bothy on Brae Rannoch). Shielings are mentioned in the folk song "Mairi's Wedding", in the weaver poet Robert Tannahill's song "Gilly Callum", and in the musicologist William Sharp's "Shieling Song" of 1896, and in the title of Marjory Kennedy-Fraser's tune "Island Sheiling Song". Edward Thomas wrote a poem called "The Shieling". The Scottish poet Robert Burns mentions a "shiel" in his song "Bessy and her Spinnin' Wheel" and his poem "The Country Lass".

== Case studies ==
Shieling huts were not always addressed in the earliest work of the Scottish national archaeological survey body, RCAHMS, for two principal reasons. The scope of their survey was limited to those monuments that pre-dated 1707 AD, while the resourcing of the operation was such that no comprehensive survey of such a common monument type was practical until developments in survey technology and increased resourcing in the late 1980s. That said, a mention in their report third on Caithness in 1911 gives an interesting summary of professional thinking at that time:

A number of oblong structures with rounded ends are the remains of shieling bothies connected with the practices of farming in former days. They are to be found in the upland part of the county, usually situated on low hillocks in a sheltered hollow by the side of a burn. The booth consisted of a dwelling apartment and a place for storing the milk vessels, while there was in addition a small fold to keep the calves separated from the cows during the night. The women and girls went up yearly to the shielings with the cows about midsummer, and there remained, making butter and cheese for a month or six weeks, while the hill pasture was good. The practice had fallen into disuse by the end of the 18th century.

The First Edition Survey Project (1995-2001) was a desktop survey funded and managed by Historic Scotland and the RCAHMS. The project was conceived in the context of growing concern about the state of knowledge of Scotland's medieval or later rural settlement, and its aim was to provide a rapid and nationwide enhancement to the National Monuments Record of Scotland by recording those structures depicted as unroofed on the first edition of the Ordnance Survey (OS) 6-inch map of Scotland (published between 1843 and 1878). The project was particularly successful in recording 3,103 shieling huts (or groups of huts), 55% of the total of recorded shieling huts at that time. The survey team recorded all structures associated with sheiling activity (huts, dairies and stores) as 'shieling hut'. Where the OS map had not labelled them as 'shieling' or 'old shieling', but the size, morphology or location of the structures suggested that they were shieling huts, the suffix 'possible' was added to the classification. Although roofed buildings were excluded from the project, an exception was made for the shieling huts on the Isle of Lewis, many of which were still roofed or in use at the date of the first edition survey (1848–52). The project was reported on by the RCAHMS, with a map of shieling sites.

In 1990, an archaeological survey of the Waternish peninsula on the Island of Skye by RCAHMS recorded about 60 shieling huts and 60 shieling mounds. The surveyors found the huts to be spread relatively evenly in the hinterland, and outside the main areas of settlement but on some occasions they were found within the present boundaries of a crofting township, indicating the closeness of some shieling huts to their parent settlement. Indeed, on some occasions, the huts had been leveled by cultivation and in others a township boundary had been built across them. The huts were found in three main types: sub-rectangular stone-walled huts; huts defined by a wall of turf, peat and stone which, through prolonged use, had built up into a mound; multi-celled structures. Another important characteristic was the presence, in some instances, of buildings that were similar in character to those found in pre-Clearance townships. In these cases, they were interpreted as shieling huts, albeit of a less usual form. The results of the survey have been published.

== Protection ==
Some thousands of shieling huts, or groups of huts, have been recorded in the Scottish National Record of the Historic Environment.

== See also ==
- Scottish vernacular architecture
- Croft
- Knocking stone
- Scottish Vernacular

== Sources ==
- Bil, Albert (1990). The Shieling, 1600–1840: The case of the central Scottish highlands. Edinburgh: John Donald. ISBN 978-0859761581.
- Cooper, Derek (1983). Skye. Routledge. pp. 124–125. ISBN 978-0710095657.
