= Cupstone =

Lithic artifact

Cupstones, also called anvil stones and nutting stones, are lithic artifacts having a roughly discoidal surface resulting from human action. The hemispherical indentation itself is an important element of paleoart, known as a "cupule". Cup and ring marks are also common in the Fertile Crescent and India, and later in the Mediterranean, Atlantic, and Alpine regions of Europe, sometimes associated with complex petroglyphs or megalithic monuments.

== Etymology ==
One encyclopedia of archaeology treats "pitted stone", "cupstones", and "nutting stones" as synonyms and says that they "may have been formed by cracking nutshells, though this activity lacks adequate confirmation through ethnographic examples or published experimentation."

== Purpose ==
These objects have received little study, perhaps because edged tools and weapons have more intrinsic interest to private collectors, but closer study of them might reveal something of domestic practices and toolmaking technology. There is no agreement upon their purpose or purposes, which may have included the processing of food, medicine or pigments, storage, arrow-production or fire-drilling. As such, they could represent a primitive form of mortar and pestle. The age of these man-made structures is difficult to ascertain, but generally they are believed to have been produced in the Bronze Age and Upper Paleolithic although some, for example in North America and Europe, were generated at a later date.

These stones have also been shown to function as voided anvils upon which and across which stone blades were laid flat. A striker was struck against the blade edge to chip away and sharpen the blade edge. One video shows a man creating such a cup stone by repeatedly flaking a blade laid across it. The size was limited by the danger of breaking the blade if striking it while the void was too wide.

Visually, they may resemble omarolluks, a naturally occurring feature of sedimentary rock occurring exclusively in the Belcher Islands, an archipelago accounting for 0.25% of Hudson Bay, whence they are thought to have been spread by glaciers.

== Distribution ==
Similar objects can be found on all continents except Antarctica. They are associated with Celtic Europe, prehistoric Australia, Borneo and the Middle East. Some of the earliest cupules can be found at the Bhimbetka cave site in India, dating to 290,000-700,000 BCE, but in Europe they do not pre-date the most recent cold phase (the Würm glaciation or Weichselian glaciation). Some scholars insist the items are "false" artifacts, that is, their form results from natural processes rather than human activity. However, no one has yet described processes that might both produce such effects and also explain the distribution of the effects and the objects. Certainly air-bubbles in stone, broken open and eroded, could produce some of these phenomena. The objects are familiar in Illinois, Ohio, Indiana, Arkansas, Kentucky, Tennessee, Alabama and Mississippi, and occur elsewhere as well.

The pattern, size and number of concavities is not predictable, nor is material—impressions are found in soft sandstone and hard granite. Cupstones may exhibit a mixture of large and small indentations, perhaps indicating multiple uses over a considerable span of time. Indentations range from barely visible 1/16" to 6". Examination under magnification suggests the impressions were at least in some cases formed by rotary grinding, particularly in softer rocks. In most cases, archeological evidence of cupstones on hard rock surfaces and monoliths indicates that they were created by direct percussion with rock hammers. Typical impressions are of the simple pit type, though some cavities have been excavated to produce an opened-sphere type of pocket, by means and for reasons unknown. Very large specimens weighing several tons and with dozens of impressions several inches across are thought to be cult objects; they have been found throughout the Mississippi Valley.

== Historic accounts ==
There are several ethnographic accounts of the Native American use of nutting stones in the historic times. One account says "the Virginia Indians in 1587 tells us that each household had stones for cracking nuts and for grinding shell and other materials." It goes on to say that "This statement would doubtless be equally true if applied at that time to almost any tribe inhabiting the section east of the Mississippi."

In Hawaii, cup and ring marks are associated with petroglyphs, and those occurring in the boundary regions of Apuki and Puna lands have been used as depositories for a child's navel cord, a custom also observed in other Polynesian peoples.

== Interpretation ==
Early observers saw the processing of mast using stones, and one later recreation achieved similar results: nuts were placed, one at a time, on stone (an "anvil" stone) and then struck with a smaller "hammer" stone: "As nuts were cracked in this manner a pit developed in the lower stone; the pit deepened as additional nuts were cracked, and this facilitated the cracking process since nuts were held rather stationary in this 'seat.'"

The most likely interpretation seems that these artifacts represent a single technique of shaping or adapting stone for multiple purposes, some unguessed (for instance, the function of the smallest pits) and that the objects could be used by single or multiple individuals over long periods of time, and for various purposes. Indeed, the apparent randomness of their distribution may indicate that they were left lying as modified natural resources, whether with benevolent intent or because they did not represent a sufficient investment of time and labor to justify transporting them ("opportunistic" tools). More simply, perhaps the users intended to return to the same area during the next year's mast-gathering period.

The now traditional term "nutting stone" may be justified, as may "straightening stone" or "shaft-anchor" (for straightening arrow-shafts) within a larger class we might call "poculoliths" (<L. poculus, "small pocket", "cup"). While an equivalent to "pitted stone", the proposed term has the advantage of wider comprehensibility among international scholars as the worldwide distribution of the form becomes increasingly evident.

Another interpretation of these structures is fossilization. Anatomical structures of the orbit, skull, joints, organs, antler and dental cavities are similar. Fragmentation may have occurred before or after fossilization, natural human smoothing and polishing. The structure becomes a ubiquitous, multipurpose tool for humans to exploit.

Cupstone sites in Northern Italy, Switzerland and the Atlantic regions, also known as "druid altars" or "Opferkessel" (sacrificial bowl), are associated with places of worship due their locality close to glacial erratics, view points and treacherous alpine trails. Some of the prehistoric cupstone sites north of the Alps along the Jura mountains, for example near Grenchen, show a row of cups with possibly astronomical orientation. However, cupstones are usually not associated with calendar functions as this is sometimes the case with menhirs and megaliths.

== Omars ==
Nutting stones can be very similar in appearance to omars. Omars are naturally formed stones that have hemispherical voids in them.

== See also ==
- Knocking stone
