= Knocking stone =

Stone food grinding tool

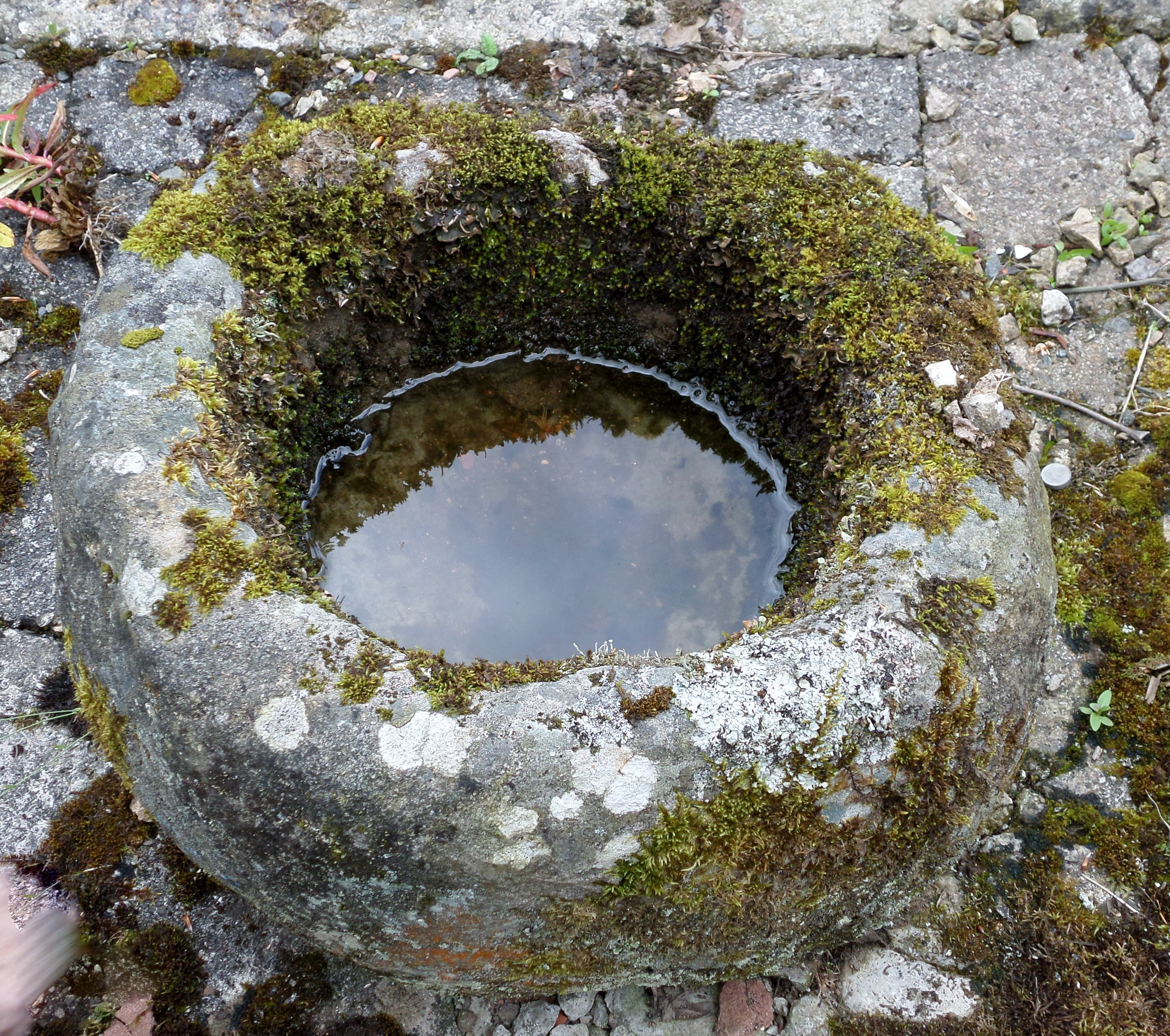
A knocking stone.

Knocking stones, Knockin'-stanes or Clach chnotainn in Scottish Gaelic were exposed bedrock stone or boulders with a pot-shaped concavity cut into them used for husking barley and other cereals before the introduction of other methods of milling grain or when only small quantities of cereal were processed.

== History ==
Knocking or husking stones were generally replaced by quern stones which in turn were eventually replaced by water and wind powered mills. They were once used by every farming household; abandoned examples can still be found in Ireland, the Highlands, and the Western Isles. In 1635 however the Chronicle of Perth records how they still had small scale use – "Thair wes great skairstie of wictuall, and elding mylnis gaed not, and thair wes no passage nor travelling to bring ony in. At that tyme aill wes waid skant. They knokit malt in knoking stones."

Knocking stones remained in use until the end of the nineteenth century in the Highlands and islands, and elsewhere in rural areas.

== Structure and function ==
A relatively large pot-shaped cavity or knocking well was cut into exposed bedrock or boulders, grain was added and pounded with a rounded stone or with a hardwood mell on a long handle until the husks were knocked off or hulled and easily removed. Oak was often used for the head and pine as the handle of the mell.

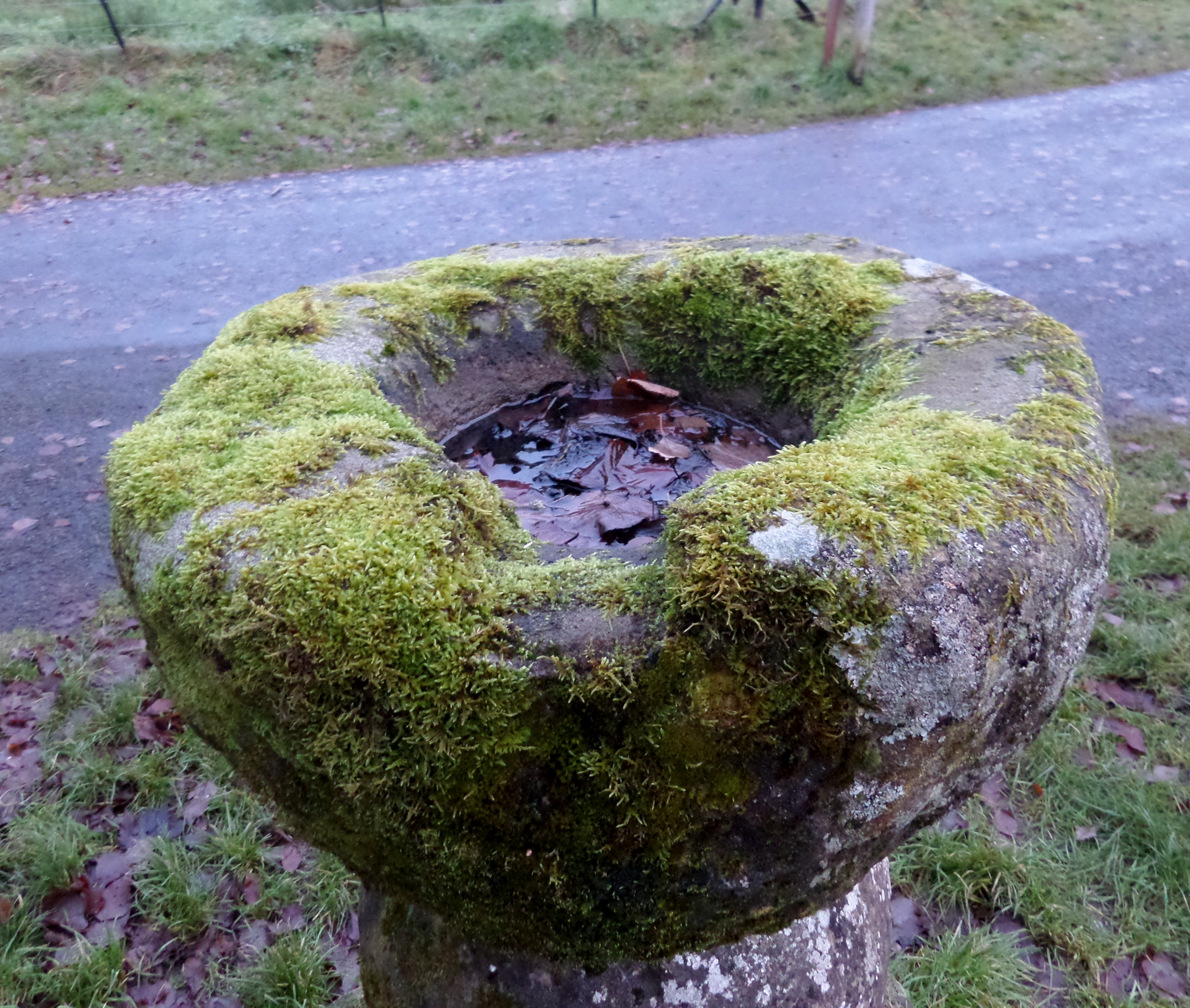
A knocking stone at the Greenbank Garden.

Apart from preparing barley grain or pot-barley it was also used in preparation for brewing and roots, etc. that could be pounded for eating or as food for animals, especially in the winter months. Green gorse or furze needles were also pounded for use as fodder for horses.

The finished product after pounding oats was known as ‘knockit bere’ and could also be used for making a broth with the addition of beef or mutton. Bere was a primitive form of barley. The pounded barley grains were more often used for baking bannocks than for making bread in Scotland.

Being made of stone, many survived after their primary use ceased, and some had secondary uses such as drinking troughs for poultry. Local stone was used ranging from granite, schist and sandstone to marble. An example of the size of the knocking well in a knocking stone is 0.25m in diameter by 0.15m in depth.

One example of a knocking stone at the old St Macarius chapel site of Mackrikil near Dailly in Ayrshire has a prominent cross carved on one side that may have been intended to bless or protect the barley, etc. that was processed in it. Locally it was known as the 'font' and that indicates an understandable confusion with a stoup used to hold holy water for baptism. The addition of a religious symbol to a stone used to prepare food is also recorded for quern stones as one was discovered at Dunadd in Scotland which has a cross carved into the upper stone. This example has a high quality of finishing which reflects its 'cost' and enhances its symbolic value and social significance. The cross is likely to have 'protected' the cereal and the resultant flour from evil, such as fungal rust or ergot. The religious association with knocking stones may be that the process of making bread produces the staple of life.

The pounding action of the cereals over a period of time sometimes resulted in the base of the knocking stone being knocked out and the knocking stone discarded.

Some had basic stone lids or covers made of other materials such as wood. William Wallace is said to have rested on a knocking or husking stone in the village of Longforgan during his flight from Dundee following an incident in which he had killed the English governor's son. The stone and its lid are preserved in the Dundee Museum.

The knocking stone was usually kept in the barn and was seen as a precious family heirloom that was always taken with a family if they moved. The mill or beetle had a round or oval-shaped end to it.

Some knocking stones are found at the sites of the temporary mountain summer dwellings known as shielings.

Cupstones may represent a similar function to knocking stones for the processing of smaller quantities of seeds, etc and sometimes having the advantage of being portable. They may have been identified as examples of cup and ring mark stones on occasions.

== See also ==
- Bedrock mortar
- Quern-stone
