= Jato (grinder) =

Stone grinder used in Himalayan region

A jato (Nepali: जाँतो, Nepali pronunciation: [d͡zãto]) is a type of rotary hand-quern or grinder used in the Himalayan region of Nepal, Sikkim, Darjeeling and Bhutan. It is a traditional tool to grind grains.

A jato consists of two round stones or discs. The lower stone is immovable, attached to the ground or floor in the house, and has a spike or a piece of wood (mānī, Nepali: मानी, Nepali pronunciation: [mani]) fixed in the centre as an axle to keep the upper stone or disc in place while grinding. The upper stone has two holes in it, one going completely through the middle, both for the mānī and also to pour grain into. The other hole goes partway in and is off-center to hold the wooden handle (hāto, Nepali: हातो, Nepali pronunciation: [hato]) used to turn the stone. The person who grinds sits next to the jato and grinds moving the handle in a circular motion, pouring grain into the central hole on top.

An ancient tool used to grind food items in Nepal.

Advantages of the jato:

1. Easy to use.
2. Efficient flow of ground grains.
3. Reduces the force needed to grind.

Disadvantages of the jato:

1. Continuous use of the jato causes pain in the palm.
2. Not suitable for children.
3. Immovable and bulky.
