= Quern-stone =

Stone tool for hand-grinding

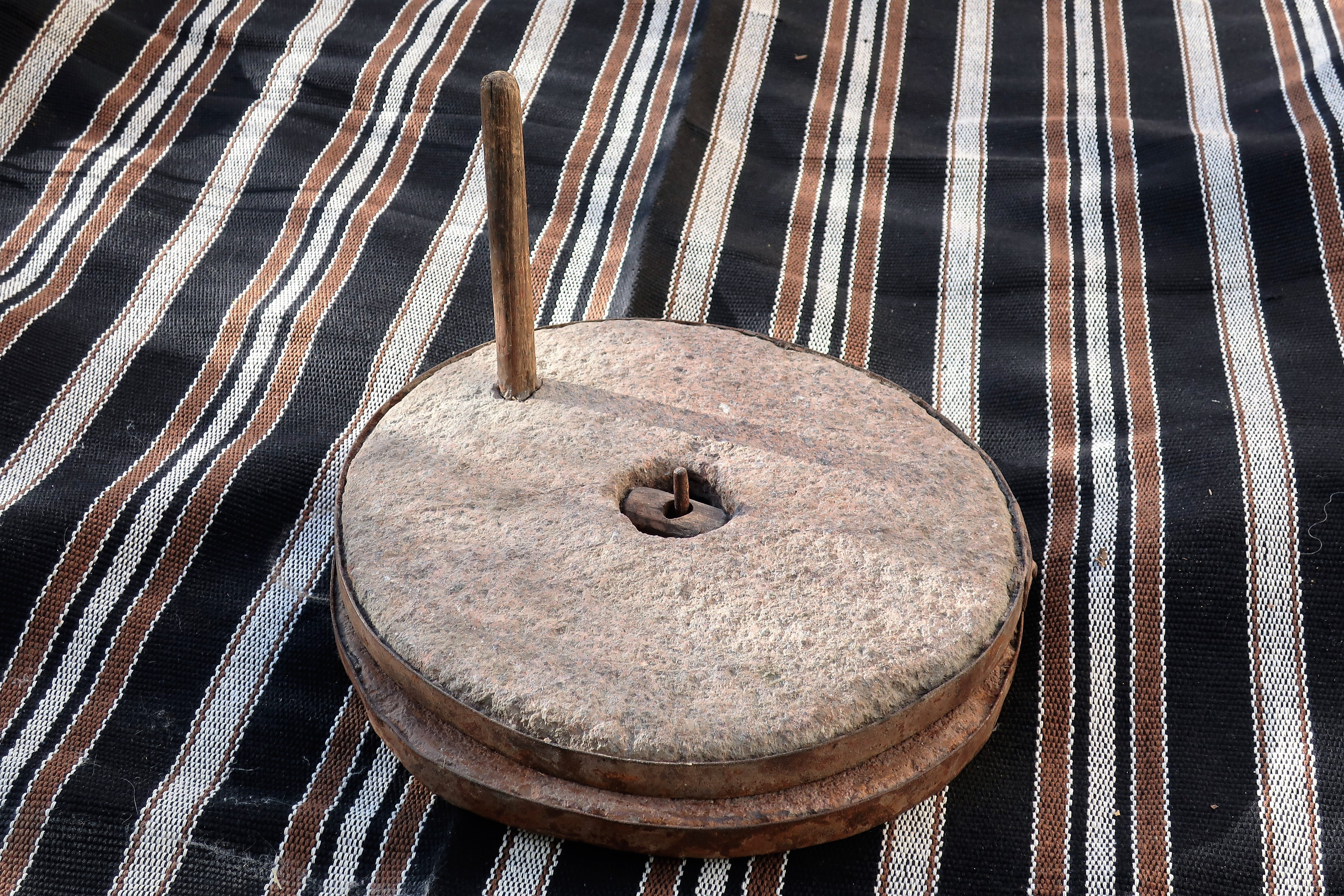
Disc quern made of basalt stone

Nepali women using quern-stones to grind grains

A quern-stone is a stone tool for hand-grinding a wide variety of materials, especially for various types of grains.

They are used in pairs. The lower stationary stone of early examples is called a saddle quern, while the upper mobile stone is called a muller, rubber, or handstone. The upper stone was moved in a back-and-forth motion across the saddle quern. Later querns are known as rotary querns. The central hole of a rotary quern is called the eye, and a dish in the upper surface is known as the hopper. A handle slot contained a handle which enabled the rotary quern to be rotated.

They were first used in the Neolithic era to grind cereals into flour.

== Design ==
The upper stones were usually concave while the lower ones were convex. Quern-stones are frequently identifiable by their grooved working surfaces which enabled the movement of flour. Sometimes a millrind was present as a piece of wood (or other material), which allowed the cereal etc. to be added but still acted as a centering device. The upper stone sometimes had a cup-shaped area around the hopper hole with a raised edge. Most handstones have a handle hole on the upper surface, but one class of quern-stones have a slot handle which indicates that a piece of wood was placed horizontally and protruded out from the edge so that the operator could turn the stone by standing and using a rod vertically. One class of upper quern-stones has from two to three sockets for the rod used to turn them and this is thought to reflect the need to reduce wear and tear by having alternative points of contact when in active use.

== Grain ==
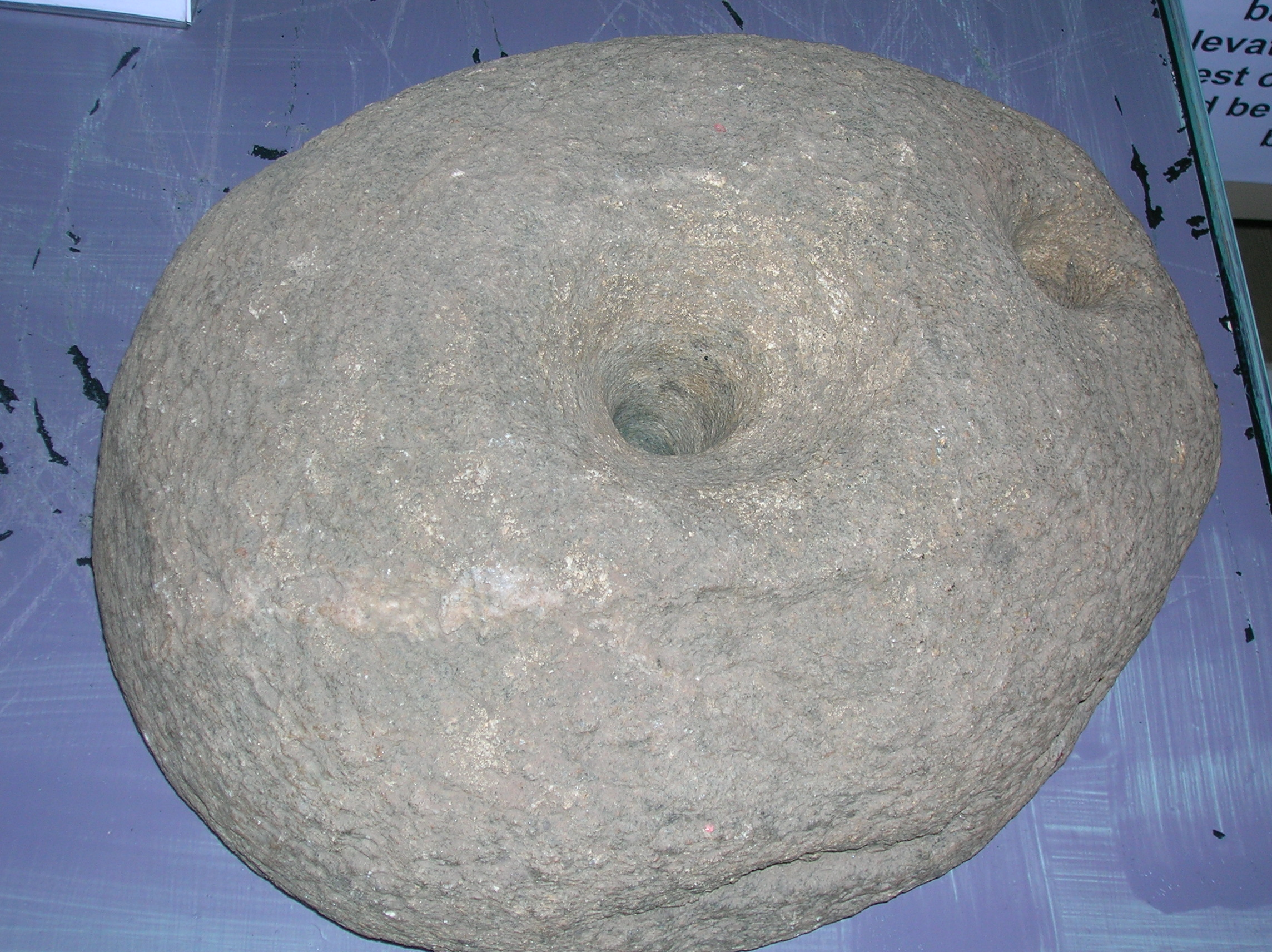
The upper stone of a Scottish hand quern from Dalgarven Mill, North Ayrshire

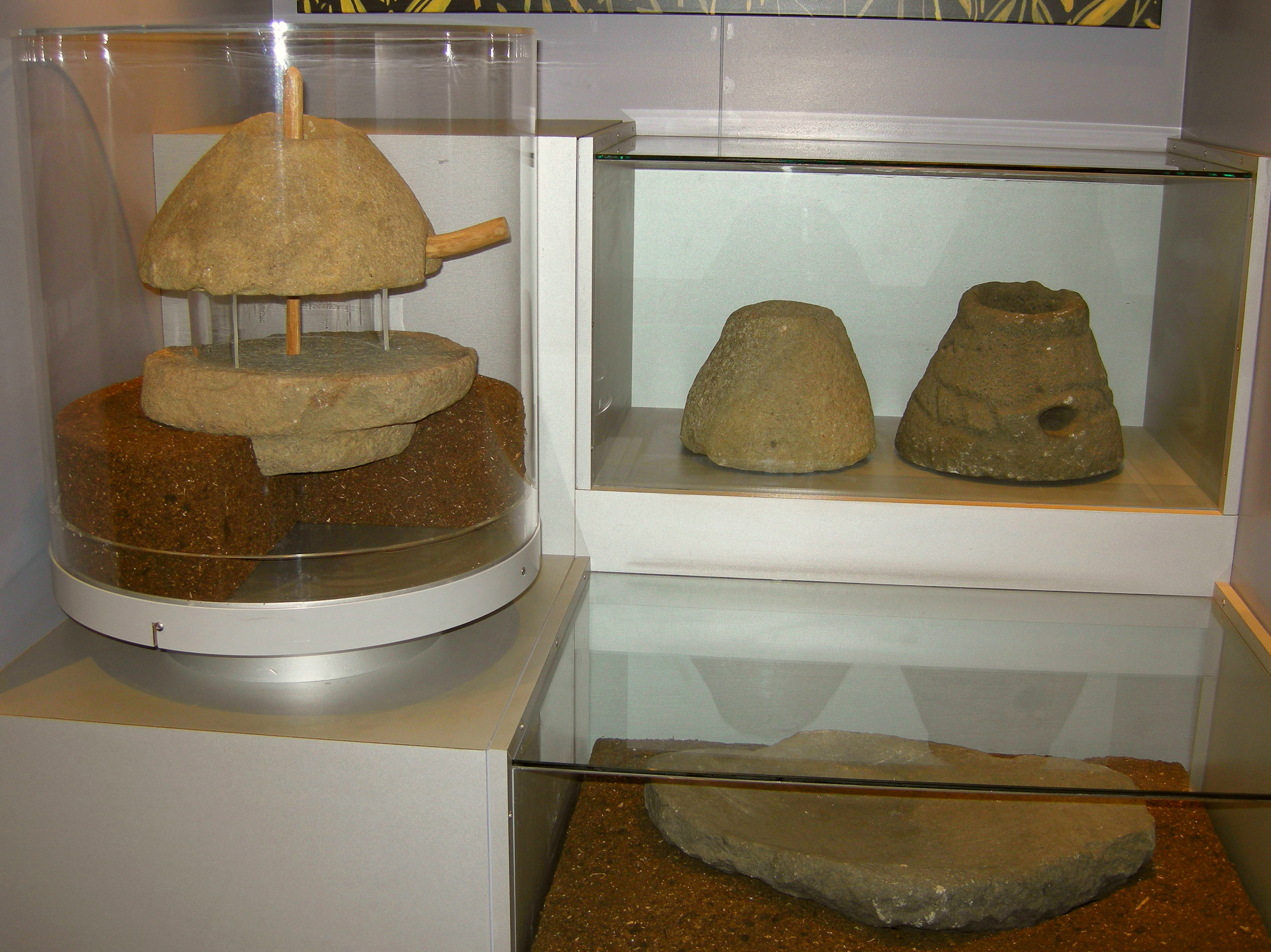
Revolving beehive quern-stones and [lower] a saddlestone on display at Cliffe Castle Museum, in Keighley, West Yorkshire

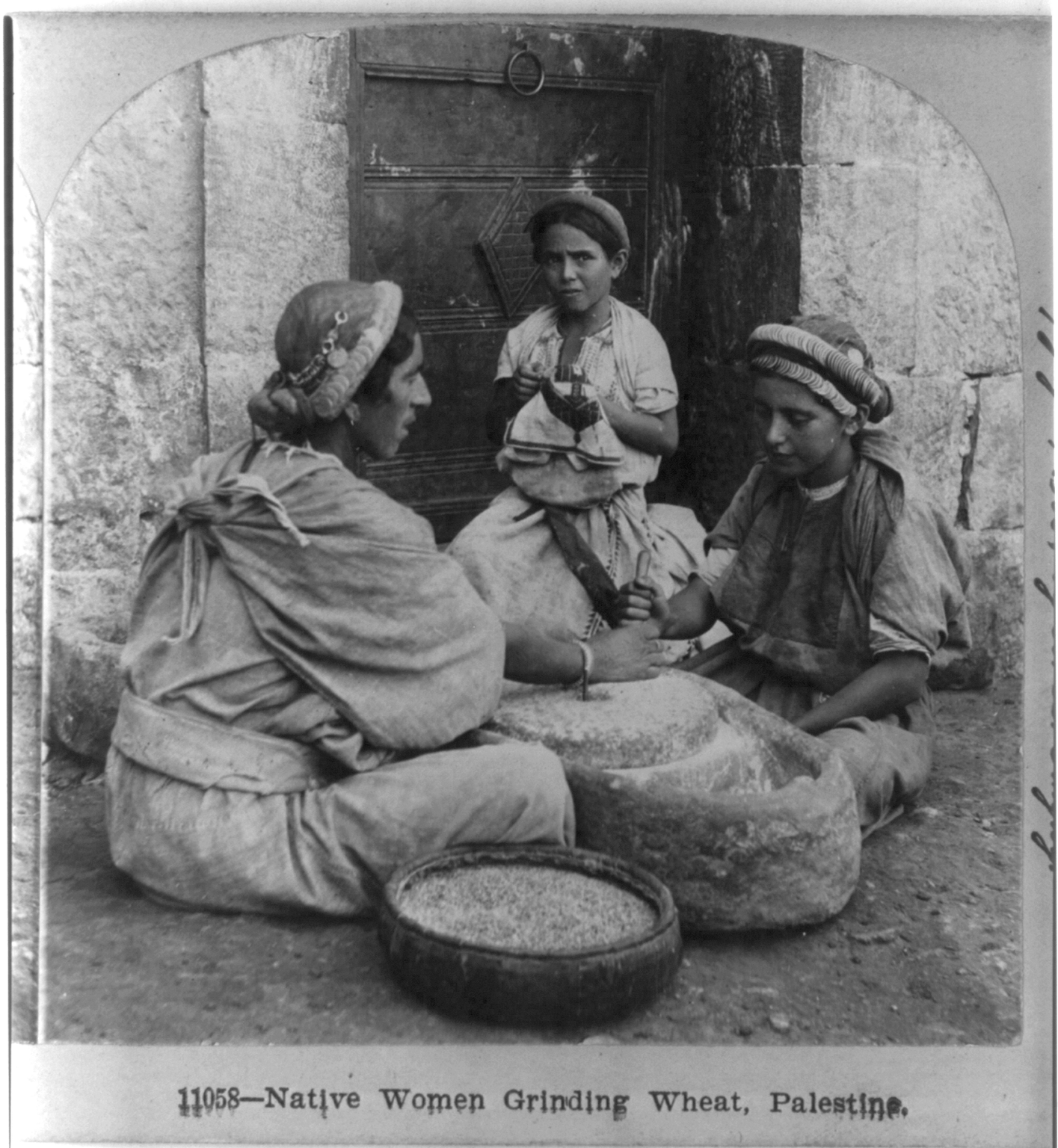
Women grind grain with a quern, Palestine (1900)

Quern-stones have been used by numerous civilizations throughout the world to grind materials, the most important of which was usually grain to make flour for bread-making. They were generally replaced by millstones once mechanised forms of milling appeared, particularly the water mill and the windmill, although animals were also used to operate the millstones. However, in many non-Westernised, non-mechanised cultures they are still manufactured and used regularly and have only been replaced in many parts of the world in the last century or so.

The use of grinding stones for vegetal food processing, and possibly the production of flour, was widespread across Europe from at least 30,000 years ago.

In early Mayan civilizations the process of nixtamalization was distinctive in that hard, ripe kernels of maize (corn) were boiled in water and lime, thus producing nixtamal which was then made into unleavened dough for flat cakes by grinding with a handstone on a saddle-type quern (metate).

Quern stones were used in China at least 10,000 years ago to grind wheat into flour. The production of flour by rubbing wheat by hand took several hours. Due to their form, dimensions, and the nature of the treatment of the surfaces, they reproduce precisely the most ancient implements used for grinding cereal grain into flour. Saddle querns were known in China during the Neolithic Age but rotary stone mills did not appear until the Warring States Period. A prehistoric quern dating back to 23,000 BCE was found at the Longwangchan archaeological site, in Hukou, Shaanxi in 2007. The site is located in the heartland of the northern Chinese loess plateau near the Yellow River.

== Other materials ==
As well as grain, ethnographic evidence and Mesopotamian texts show that a wide range of foodstuffs and inorganic materials were processed using stone querns or mortars, including nuts, seeds, fruit, vegetables, herbs, spices, meat, bark, pigments, temper and clay. Moreover, one study analysing quern-stones noted that a number of querns had traces of arsenic and bismuth, unlike their source rocks, and had levels of antimony which were ten times higher than those of the rocks. The authors concluded that this was probably due to the use of these querns in the preparation of medicines, cosmetics, dyes or even in the manufacture of alloys.

Querns were widely used in grinding metals ores after mining extraction. The aim was to liberate fine ore particles which could then be separated by washing for example, prior to smelting. They were thus widely used in gold mining in antiquity.

In Shetland, tobacco was not smoked when first introduced, but instead was ground up into snuff, and inhaled up the nose. Snuff-querns consisted of an upper and lower stone, fixed together by a central iron pivot. The quern was held on the user's lap, the eye of the quern was filled with dried tobacco leaves, and then the upper-stone was turned using the handle. The friction caused by the turning ground the leaves into a fine powder that built up around the edge of the lower-stone. Many snuff-querns had a small hole or cut made near the edge of the upper-stone, into which a pointed end of a lamb's horn was placed in order to turn the stone; an alternative to using a handle.

== Incidental uses ==
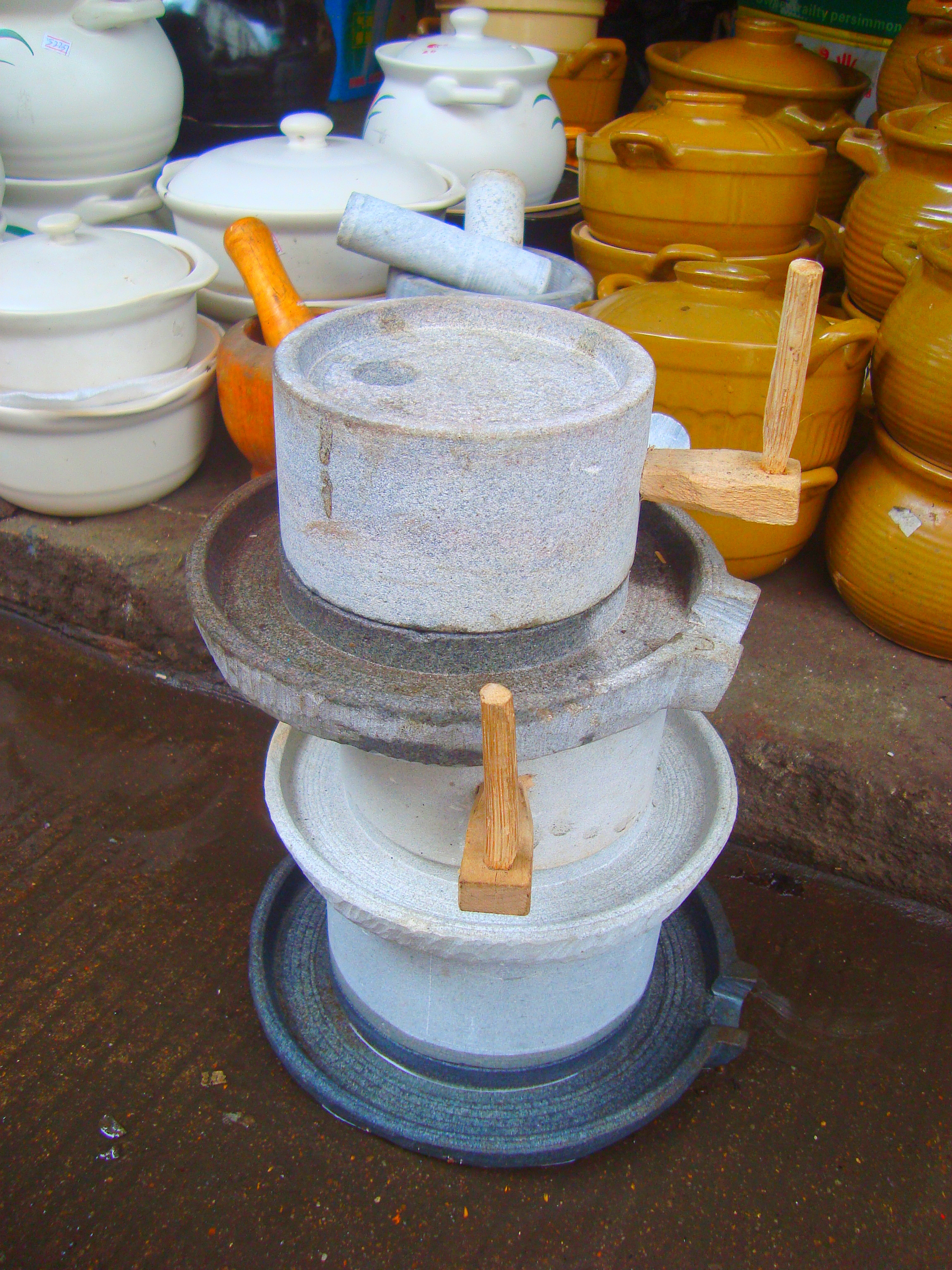
A stack of quern-stones for sale in a market in Haikou, Hainan, China. These quern-stones are only about 30 cm wide.

Quern stones' ubiquity led to ancillary uses. For example, DeBoer, in his review of the traditional gambling games of North American tribes, reports that one of the games involved bouncing a group of split canes off a quern.

Quern stones may have been used as improvised weapons, as mentioned in the Bible: "But a certain woman threw an upper-millstone on Abimelech's head, and crushed his skull." (Judg. 9:53 NRSV)

== Manufacture ==
The best type of stone from which to manufacture quern-stones are igneous rocks such as basalt. These have naturally rough surfaces, but grains do not detach easily, so the material being ground does not become gritty. However, such rocks are not always available, meaning that quern-stones have been manufactured from a wide variety of rocks, including sandstone, quartzite and limestone. Quernmore Crag near Lancaster in England is named after the quarrying of millstone grit used to make quern stones in these parts. The names of the mountains of Whernside and Great Whernside in the Yorkshire Dales have the same origin.

Rutter was able to show, for the southern Levant, that basalt quern-stones were preferred to those manufactured from other rock types. Basalt quern-stones were therefore transported over long-distances, leading him to argue that, despite their everyday, utilitarian function, they were also used as a status symbol.

Research in Scotland has indicated that to a degree regional styles existed.

== Types ==
Knocking stones were used in the preparation of small quantities of cereal, however the earliest forms of quern were the saddle and trough querns. The earliest quern so far discovered dates to c. 9,000 BCE and was found at Abu Hureyra, Syria. A later development was the rotary quern, which takes several forms.

=== Saddle quern ===
The saddle quern is produced by rocking or rolling the muller using parallel motions (i.e., pushing and pulling the handstone), which forms a shape looking like a saddle. These are the most ancient and widely used type of quern-stone and in northern Britain were superseded around the 5th to the 4th century BC by the more efficient rotary quern. The handstones for saddle querns are generally either roughly cylindrical (not unlike a rolling pin) and used with both hands, or rough hemispheres and used with one hand. This provides a crushing motion, not a grinding action and is more suitable for crushing malted grain. It is not easy to produce flour from a saddle quern with unmalted grain. The muller is also referred to as a 'rubber' or 'mouler'.

=== Rotary quern ===
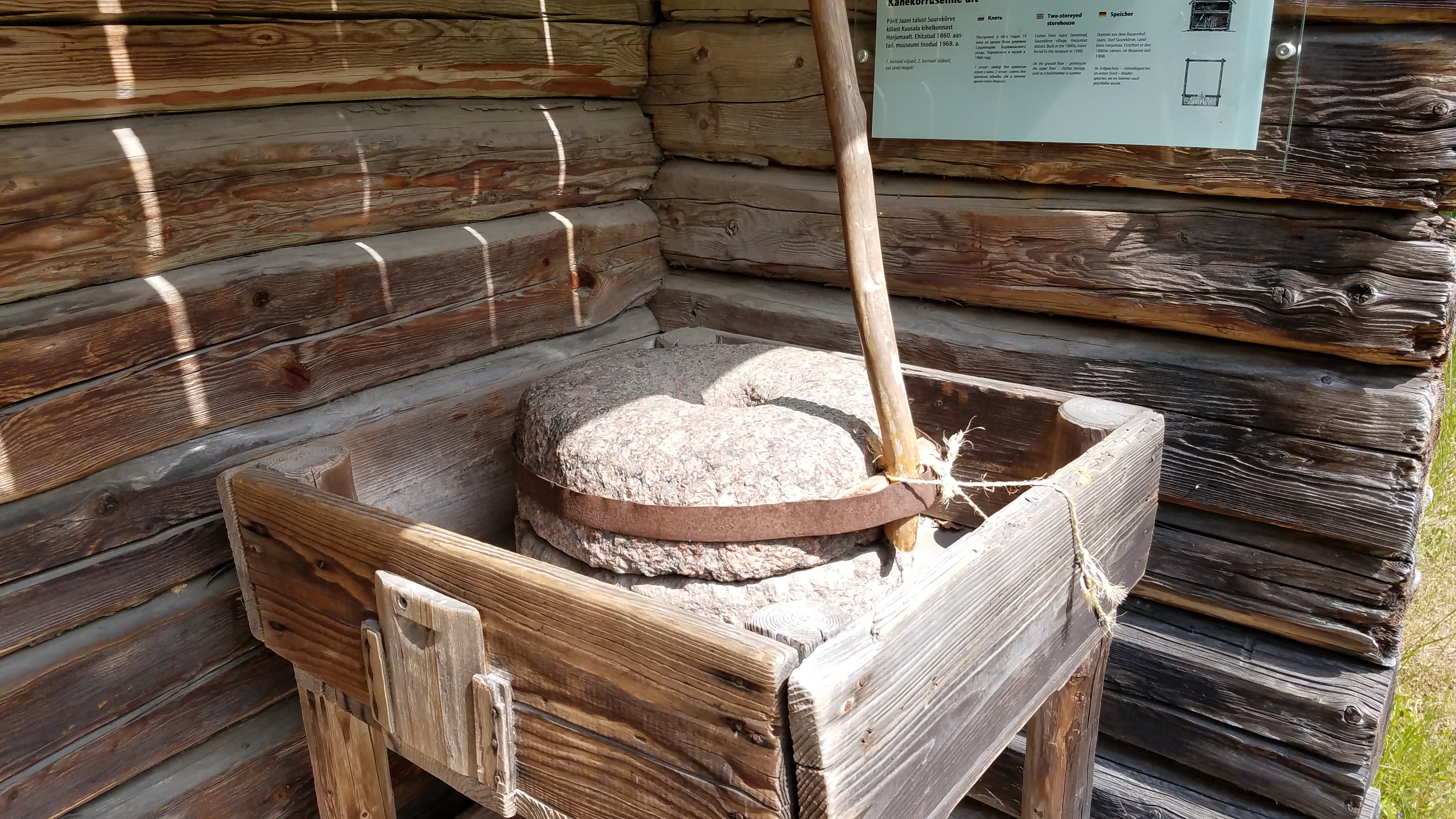
Rotary hand quern at the Estonian Open Air Museum

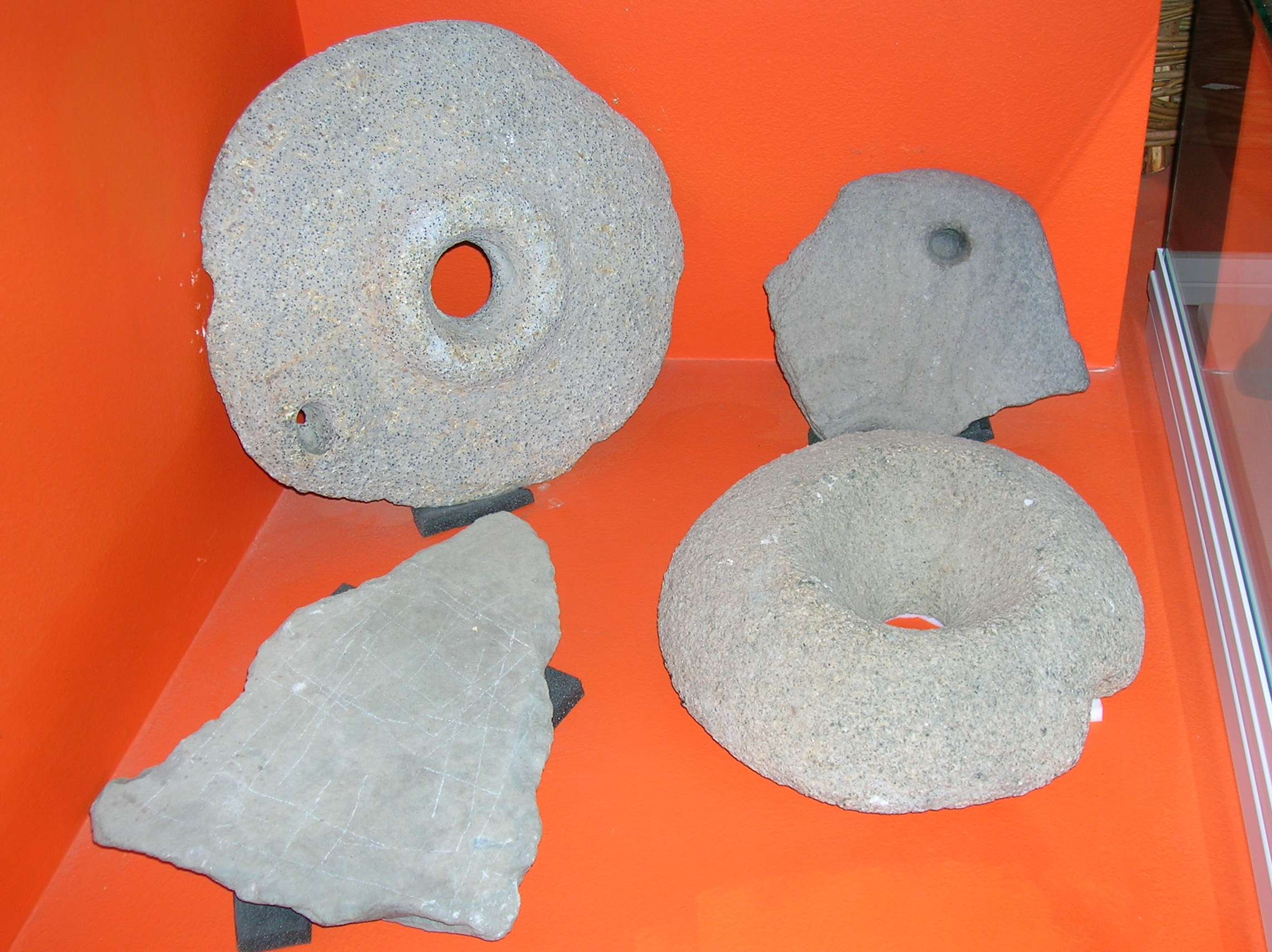
Querns from the Whithorn Museum, Dumfries and Galloway, southern Scotland

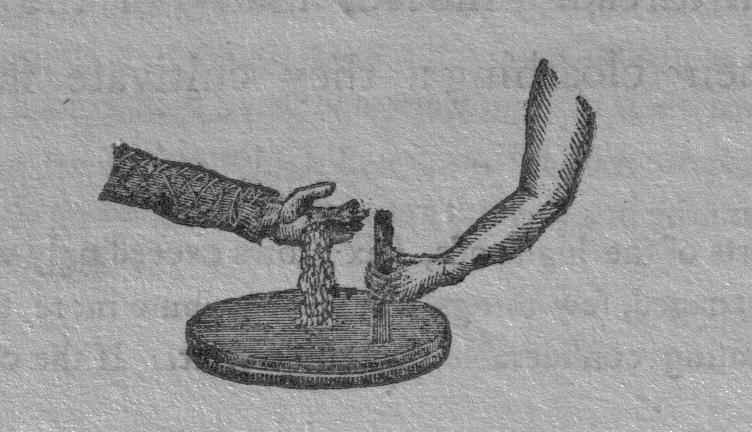
A hand quern being operated

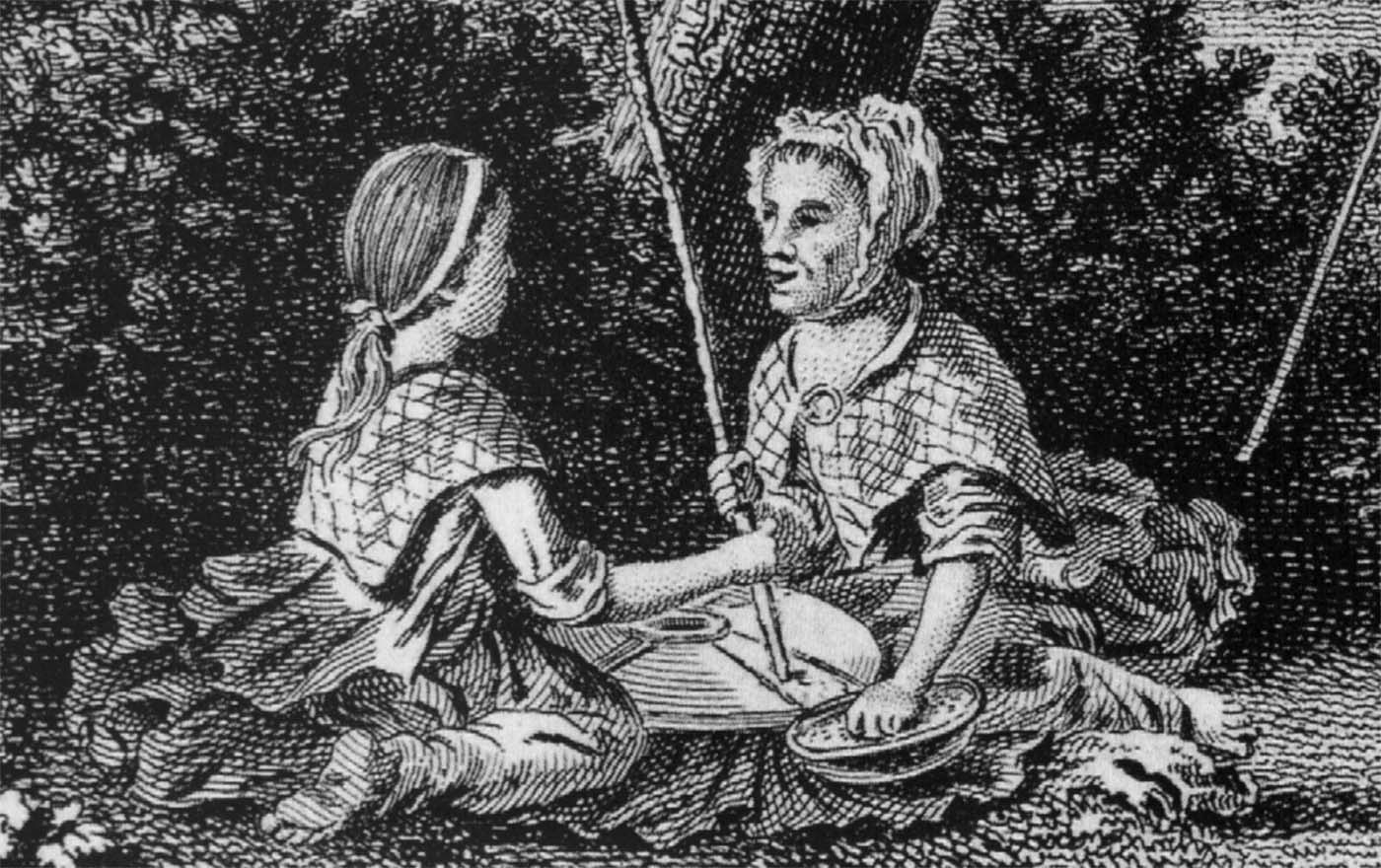
The quern rests on the arisaid of the woman on the right, possibly to catch grain; she feeds the stone with grain from the bowl at her left.

As the name implies, the rotary quern used circular motions to grind the material, meaning both the upper and lower quern were generally circular. The handstone of a rotary quern is much heavier than that of saddle quern and provides the necessary weight for the grinding of unmalted grain into flour. In some cases the grinding surfaces of the stones fit into each other, the upper stone being slightly concave and the lower one convex. Rotary querns may have been in use in Scotland as early as the 5th or 4th centuries BC.

Beehive quern
In this type, the upper stone is hemispherical, or bun-shaped, with a central conical hopper to hold the grain that falls down a hole to the grinding surface. It is held in position with a pivot that fits into a central hole in the bottom stone. The upper stone also has a deep horizontal socket in its steep side in which to place the wooden peg used as a handle to rotate or oscillate the upper stone. This was the earliest type of rotary quern to appear in the British Isles. It arrived in Britain in the middle of the Iron Age (about 400–300 BC) and spread into the northern half of Ireland, probably from Scotland, some time after the 2nd century BC.
Disc quern
Disc querns consist of two flat disc-shaped stones, an upper stone with a cylindrical perforation for containing a handle and a lower stone with a central spindle hole. The adjustable, discoid rotary quern has larger, flatter and more discoid stones than the beehive type. The lower stone was completely perforated. The long handle rotated in a shallow socket in the upper surface of the upper stone. This Iron Age type closely resembles the adjustable Highland quern still in use in historic times. In Ireland, disc querns were the dominant type of querns in use between the years 500 CE–1500 CE, and usually had a diameter of 30–60 cm. Garnett in his 1800 tour of Scotland describes the use of a hand quern as follows:

The quern consists of two circular pieces of stone, generally grit or granite, about twenty inches in diameter. In the lower stone is a wooden peg, rounded at the top; on this the upper stone is nicely balanced, so as just to touch the lower one, by means of a piece of wood fixed in a large hole in this upper piece, but which does not fill the hole, room for feeding the mill being left on each side: it is so nicely balanced, that though there is some friction from the contact of the two stones, yet a very small momentum will make it revolve several times, when it has no corn in it. The corn being dried, two women sit down on the ground, having the quern between them; the one feeds it, while the other turns it round, relieving each other occasionally, and singing some Celtic songs all the time.

Miniature quern
Under 200 mm (8 in) in diameter and varying from roughly dressed to carefully worked, often with vertical handle sockets, a new class of querns has been identified having been overlooked in the past as weights, etc. In all respects they are like full sized quern stones and they show the typical wear signs that indicate that they were used for grinding small amounts of seeds, minerals or herbs. A suggestion that they may have been made as toys is thought to be unlikely.

=== Other types ===
Sound of a Roman mill

Other forms of quern-stone include hopper-rubbers and Pompeian mills, both used by the Romans. The larger rotary mills were usually worked by a donkey or horse via an extension arm of wood attached to the upper stone.

Querns utilizing crank-and-connecting rods were used in the Western Han Dynasty.

== Legislation ==
There was a legal requirement in Scotland for tenants to pay for use of the baron's mill. Early leases of mills gave to the miller the legal right to destroy quern-stones which were being used in defiance of thirlage agreements.

The obligations of thirlage eventually ceased to apply, but thirlage in Scotland was only formally and totally abolished on 28 November (Martinmas) 2004 by the Abolition of Feudal Tenure etc. (Scotland) Act 2000.

A similar obligation (the manorial right of mulcture) existed in England, established by custom only and not by statute. This was actively enforced using common law provisions. Among many recorded adjudications, the 1274 case of the abbot of St Albans Abbey, Cirencester, who owned as lord of the manor the exclusive milling rights for the whole town, is notable: he instructed his bailiffs to search townspeople's homes and seize any quern-stones they found. Eventually the town brought a case against the abbott at the town assizes. They lost, and were ordered to pay the abbot 100 marks in compensation for defaming him. To celebrate his victory, the abbot then used the stones to pave the floor of his private parlour.

Exercising the prerogative fell into gradual disuse and the last instance was in Wakefield, Yorkshire, when in 1850 the town bought out the owner of Soke Mill for £20,000 (equivalent to £2,330,000 in 2025).

== Ornament and inscription ==
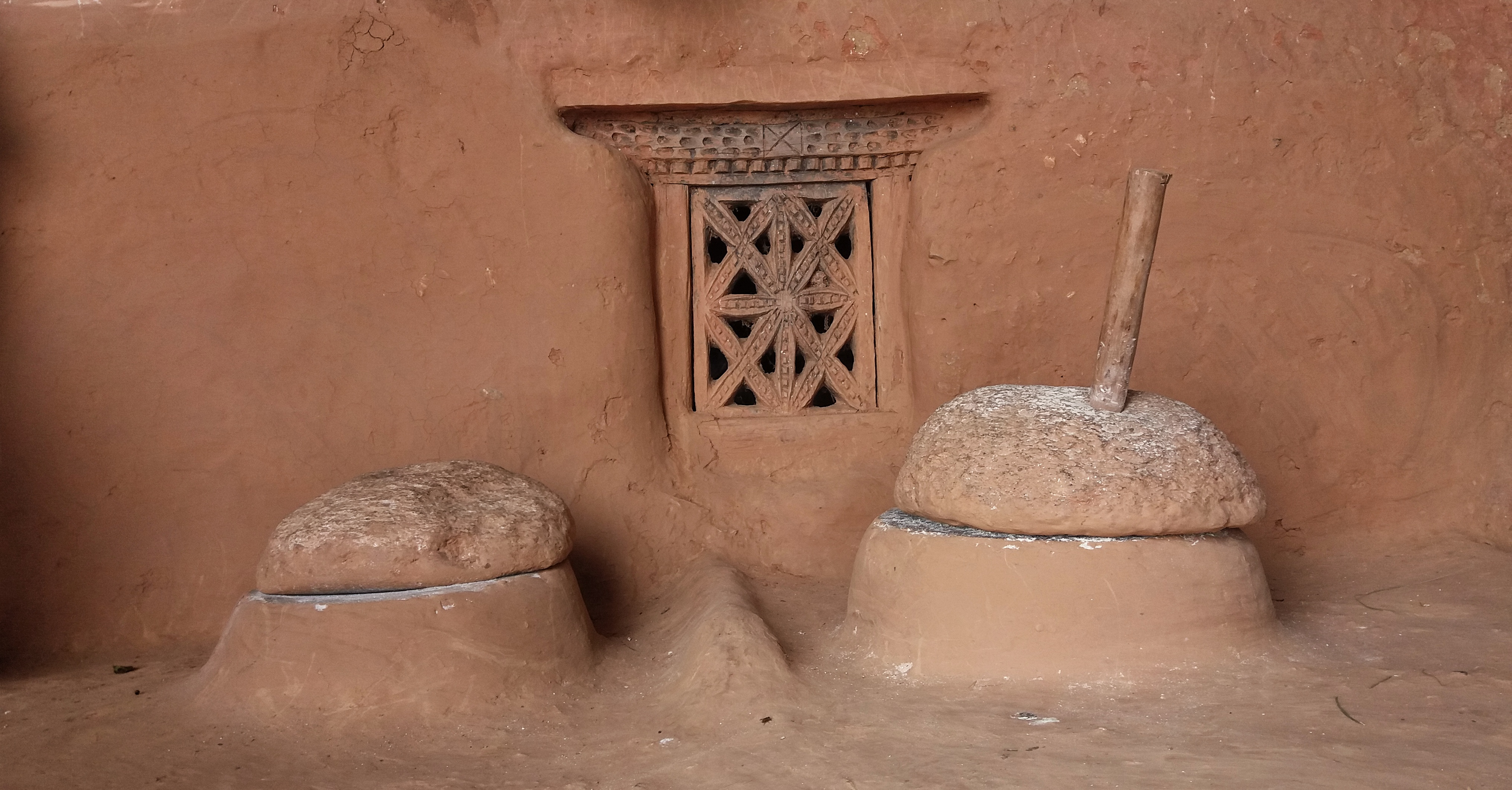
A quern-stone (right), known as jato in Nepali, on the porch of a rural Nepali house

A number of handstones have been found with extra carving, however it is not always straightforward to separate decoration from practical functional purposes. The designs invest in the appearance of the handstone when it is in circular motion, and the ability of the quern-stones to change seeds into flour may invoke a feeling of transformative magic that attracted both reverence and status to these household objects. Three beehive querns found in Ireland have inscribed ornament of La Tène type, as do examples from England and Wales. Many of the horizontal slot-handled quern-stones have decoration that usually follows the basic pattern of motifs that encircle the hopper and/or the handle slot. One type though has an irregular pattern of cup marks that encircle the hopper.

A quern was discovered at Dunadd in Scotland that has a cross carved into the upper stone. The cross has expanded terminals and ultimately derives its form from Roman and Byzantine predecessors of the fifth and sixth centuries. This example has a high quality of finishing which reflects its 'cost' and enhances its symbolic value and social significance. The cross is likely to have 'protected' the corn and the resultant flour from evil, such as fungal rust or ergot. Various legends give miraculous power to mill-stones and several have been found which have been re-used in the construction of burial cists or as tomb stones. The association between quern stones and burial may be because they are used in the process of making bread, the staple of life. A broken or disused quern therefore can be seen as symbolic of death. In Clonmacnoise, near Athlone in County Offaly in Ireland, a quern stone was found which had been made into a tombstone, having been ornamented and the name Sechnasach, who died in 928 AD, inscribed onto it. A large quern was discovered on the Lough Scur crannog in Ireland.

== Mythology ==
In the 9th century the Welsh monk Nennius wrote a history of Britain, the Historia Brittonum, in which he lists the thirteen wonders of Britain, and included in it is the wondrous 'Mauchline Quern' that ground constantly, except on Sundays. It could be heard working underground and the local placename 'Auchenbrain' may celebrate it, translating from the Gaelic as 'field of the quern'.

== See also ==
- Jato (grinder) – Stone grinder used in Himalayan region
- Metate – Mesoamerican quern or milling-stone
- Millstone – Stones used in gristmills, for grinding wheat or other grains
- Mano (archaeology) – Hand-held stone tool used with a metate or quern to process or grind food by hand
- Sharpening stone – Abrasive slab used to sharpen tools

== Bibliography ==
- DeBoer, W. (2001) Of dice and women: gambling and exchange in Native North America, In Journal of Archaeological Method and Theory 8:215-268.
- Gauldie, Enid (1981) The Scottish Miller 1700–1900. Pub. John Donald. ISBN 0-85976-067-7. 98-99.
- Lease, N., Laurent, R., Blackburn, M. and Fortin, M. (2001) Caractérisation pétrologie d’artefact en basalte provenant de Tell ‘Atij et de Tell Gudeda en Syrie de Nord (3000-2500 av J-C), In Serie archéométrie 1:227-240.
- O'Sullivan, Muiris; Downey, Liam (2006). "Quern Stones". Archaeology Ireland. 20 (2): 22–25. JSTOR 20559139.
- Ritti, Tullia; Grewe, Klaus; Kessener, Paul (2007), "A Relief of a Water-powered Stone Saw Mill on a Sarcophagus at Hierapolis and its Implications", Journal of Roman Archaeology, 20: 138–163, doi:10.1017/S1047759400005341, S2CID 161937987
- Wright, K. (1992). Ground stone assemblage variations and subsistence strategies in the Levant, 22,000 to 5,500 bp, unpublished PhD thesis, Yale University.
