= Pholad borings =

Burrows created by bivalve molluscs

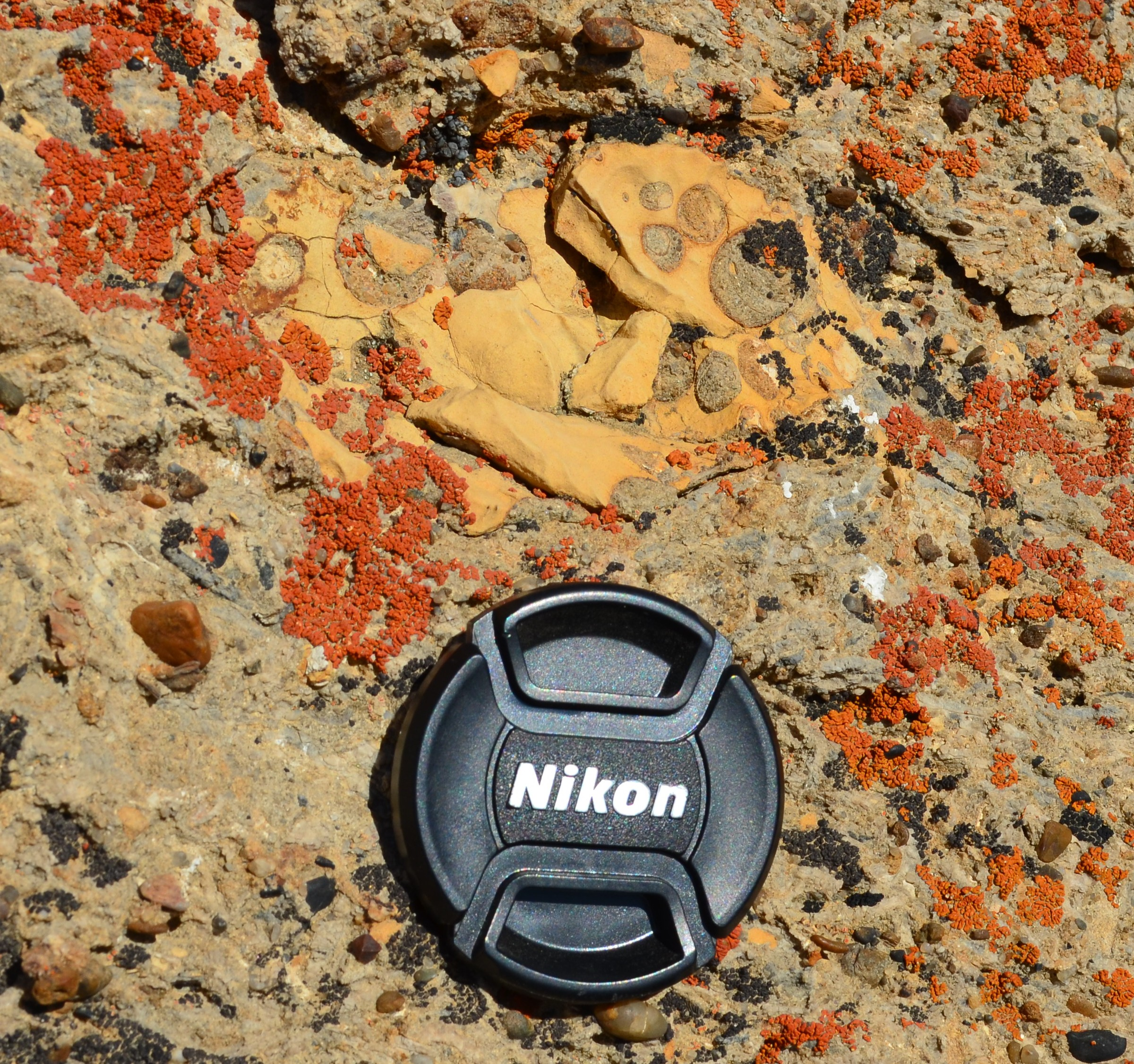
Pholad borings in a dolomite clast, Upper Miocene, Carneros Sandstone, California

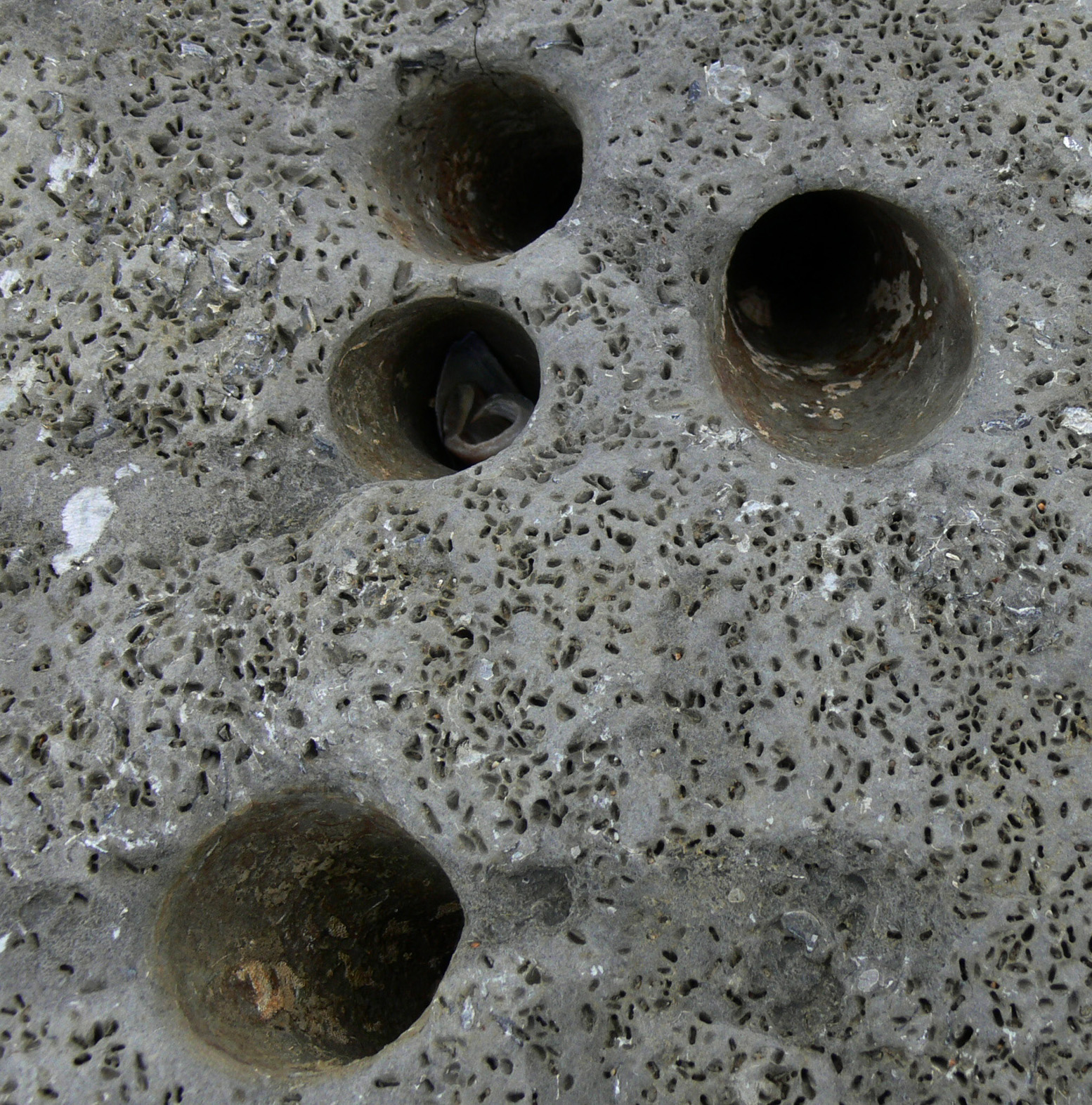
Modern Pholad borings surrounded by smaller holes similar to Trypanites traces

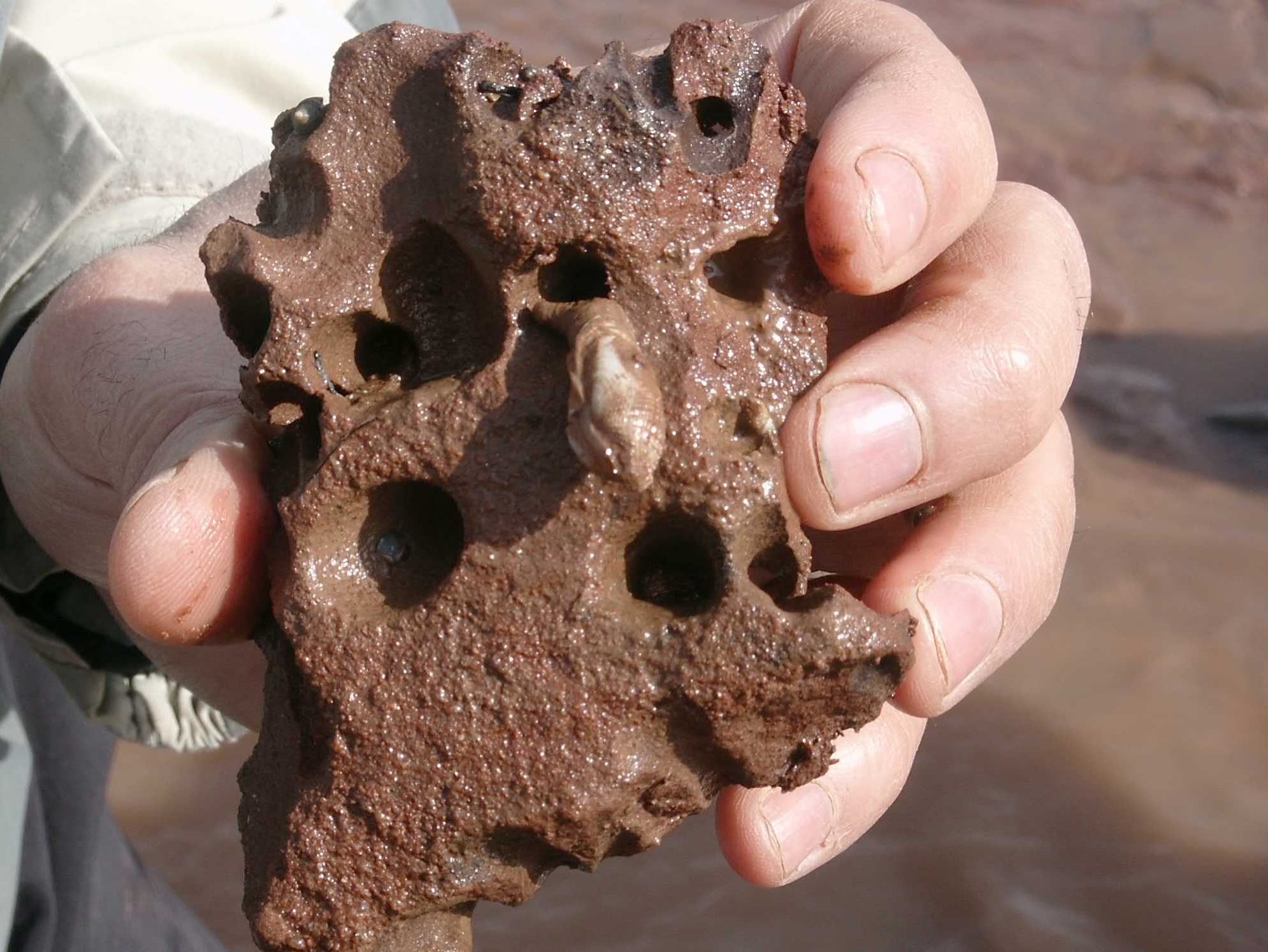
A living pholad and burrows in soft sandstone in the Bay of Fundy

Pholad borings are tubular burrows in firm clay and soft rock that have been created by bivalve molluscs (boring clams) in the family Pholadidae. The common names of clams in this family are "pholads", "piddocks", and "angel wings"; the latter because their shells are white, elongated and tend to be shaped like a wing and have sculpture somewhat reminiscent of a wing.

Pholads are unusual bivalves capable of boring into various kinds of rock, firm clay and peat, and they live permanently in the burrows they create. These clams use a set of ridges or "teeth" on the outer anterior surfaces of their shells to grind into suitable substrate, creating a non-branching burrow. Pholad burrows are typically narrower at the entrance of the burrow than they are across the interior.

Ancient, sand-filled pholad borings are a distinctive type of trace fossil known as Gastrochaenolites that are found in some limestones, dolomites and lithified mudstones. They are assigned to the Trypanites ichnofacies, and evidence submarine hardgrounds that formed soon after deposition, typically during episodes of non-sedimentation, with subsequent infilling of the burrow and burial when sedimentation resumed.

Pholad burrow trace fossils are not to be confused with specimens of the Trypanites ichnogenus, which are toothpick-sized masses of holes that characterize some hardgrounds. Trypanites probably result from a combination of mechanical abrasion and acid dissolution by the organism, whereas pholad borings are thought to be purely mechanical in origin.

== See also ==
- Gastrochaenolites
- Ichnology
- Omarolluk, another type of natural rock hole that often resembles Pholad borings.
- Trace fossil
