= Edward Lovett =

British folklorist (1852–1933)

Edward Lovett (July 1852 – 1933) was an English folklorist, recognised for his collections of charms, amulets, and objects used in children's games.

He was born in Islington and lived in Outram Road, Croydon, later residing in Caterham, and is reported to have worked as a chief cashier at a branch of the Royal Bank of Scotland in the City of London. Lovett spent his spare time collecting, writing, and lecturing on folk-lore, usually focused on objects he had collected on his walks around London, Sussex and Surrey.

Lovett was married and had at least two children. His oldest son served in the First World War.

After his retirement in 1912, he dedicated himself full time to his collection, and to sharing his love of alpine plants. An early work, self-published, is "How to Make A Rock Garden and Grow Alpine Plants", not dated, but presumably around 1900. The two interests overlapped when Lovett was able to exchange small alpine specimens, grown in seashells, for amulets and charms from the people he met in London.

He also reports having made collections in Belgium and Holland. Lovett's exhibitions in England and Wales were reviewed in the national press, some becoming permanent exhibits, and donated many objects to the Pitt Rivers Museum between 1896 and 1911. He lectured at many schools, colleges, special interest groups and societies, and reached a wide public through regular articles in local papers, describing contemporary superstitions and beliefs.

An article in the Museum's Journal in 1906 set out Lovett's vision for a folk museum of Britain, and he continued to collect and campaign with this aim in mind, until the early 1920s.

In 1914, Edward Lovett displayed over 500 dolls at the National Museum of Wales, with the intention of entertaining children and presenting to adults a "scientific history of the doll, from the standpoints of ethnography and folklore". Lovett's interest in dolls as idols, or miniature representations, led him to the theory that the dolls in coffins found on Arthur's Seat in Edinburgh in the 1830s were substitution burials for sailors lost at sea. This theory has not been supported by recent scholarship.

Over his long career collecting folklore, Lovett corresponded with many museum curators and collectors, including Henry Wellcome. The exhibition 'Folklore of London', curated by Lovett, was held at the Wellcome Historical Medical Museum in 1916.

During the late 1880s he served as President of the Croydon Microscopical and Natural History Club. After joining the Folklore Society in 1900, he presented it with talks and published papers in its Journal. Lovett did not venture into theorising on folklore, confining his research to the collection of talismans and other objects with superstitious claims. A major work, Magic in Modern London, was published in 1925.

Edward Lovett's donations can be found in many museums, including the Cuming Museum in Southwark, the Pitt Rivers Museum at the University of Oxford, the V&A Museum of Childhood, and the Museum of Childhood in Edinburgh (on long term loan from the National Museum of Wales).

An exhibition Charmed Life: The solace of objects held at the Wellcome Collection from 6 October 2011 to 26 February 2012, displayed many of Lovett's amulets alongside contemporary films and medals by artist and curator Felicity Powell.

== Publications ==
- "The Modern Commercial Aspect of an Ancient Superstition", Folklore, vol. 13 (1902), pp. 340–346
- "Fetish Worship in Central Africa", Folklore, vol. 14 no. 1 (March 1903)
- "The Whitby Snake-Ammonite Myth", Folklore, vol. 16 no. 3 (September 1905)
- "Veterinary Leechcraft", Folklore, vol. 16 no. 3 (September 1905)
- "A Scheme for a Folk Museum", Museums Journal (March 1906)
- "Superstitions and Survivals amongst Shepherds", Folklore, vol. 20 (1909),. pp. 64–70
- "Amulets from Costers' Barrows in London, Rome, and Naples", Folklore, vol. 20 (1909), pp. 70–71
- Handbook to the Exhibition of the Lovett Collection of Dolls (The Museum at Cardiff / National Museum of Wales, 1914)
- Magic in Modern London, Folklore Society (1925)
- Folk-Lore and Legend of the Surrey Hills and of the Sussex Downs and Forests (Caterham Valley, 1928)
