= List of locations associated with Arthurian legend =

The following is a list and assessment of sites and places associated with King Arthur and the Arthurian legend in general. Given the lack of concrete historical knowledge about one of the most potent figures in British mythology, it is unlikely that any definitive conclusions about the claims for these places will ever be established; nevertheless it is both interesting and important to try to evaluate the body of evidence which does exist and examine it critically. The earliest association with Arthur of many of the places listed is often surprisingly recent, with most southern sites' association based on nothing more than the toponymic speculations of recent authors with a local prejudice to promote.

== Burial places ==
- Mount Etna, the burial place of King Arthur according to Flouriant et Florete, Guillem de Torroella and Gervase of Tilbury.
- Wormelow Tump, Herefordshire, the burial place of King Arthur's son Amr according to local legend; the mound was flattened to widen the road in 1896.
- It has been suggested that the burial place of Tristan is in Douarnenez (in the island named Ile Tristan) and that of King Marc on the Menez-Hom, a small hill in the parish of Dineault.
- Another contender for Arthur's resting place is the Eildon Hills, Roxburghshire.
- Amidst the ruins of Glastonbury Abbey are tombstones claiming to mark the final resting place of Arthur and Guinevere. Glastonbury, which was once surrounded by water, is believed by some to be the Isle of Avalon, the place where the dying Arthur was destined to be healed; if this is the case, it follows that Arthur would be brought to the abbey to receive medical attention. However, Arthur's wounds were fatal, and therefore he was buried near the abbey, south of the Lady Chapel. It is said that in the 12th century, monks who wanted to raise money for the abbey dug up two sets of bones (presumably Arthur's and Gwynevere's) from that location and moved them into the abbey in order to attract pilgrims. The bones were supposedly unearthed within a large oak coffin inscribed with the words, "Here lies Arthur buried in Avalon."
- Richmond Castle. In the tale of Potter Thompson, Arthur and his knights sleep in a hidden cavern under the castle built by Alan Rufus.
- Somewhere in South Wales has been placed to two people supposedly called Arthur (labelled Arthur I and Arthur II), discovered by Alan Wilson and Baram Blackett.

== Arthur's courts ==
The following are real places which are clearly identifiable in historical texts and which are mentioned in Arthurian legend and romance as being places used by Arthur to hold court. In the romances, Arthur, like all medieval monarchs, moves around his kingdom.

- Caerleon-on-Usk in Newport, southern Wales. From Geoffrey of Monmouth.
- London, Geoffrey of Monmouth.
- Quimper, from the Lancelot-Grail romance.
- Carlisle, Cumberland, on the western edge of Hadrian's Wall (assuming Carlisle is really the Carduel of the romances).
- Carhaix, Les premiers faits du roi Arthur.
- Cardigan, from Chrétien de Troyes.
- St David's, one of Arthur's three courts in the Welsh Triads.
- Stirling is named in Beroul's 12th-century Romance of Tristan.

=== Unidentified sites ===
- Celliwig, Cornwall. Perhaps the earliest known description of a location of an Arthurian court (also in the Welsh Triads). Kelly Rounds near St Mabyn, Cornwall, is cited as one of the potential sites.
- Pen Rhionydd, Arthur's northern court in the Welsh Triads. Possibly near Stranraer in Rheged.

==== Camelot ====
Various places have been identified as the location of Camelot, including many of those listed above. Others include:

- Tintagel Castle, Cornwall, where there is evidence of high-status buildings in the 5th and 6th centuries. A sea cave below the castle is known as Merlin's Cave.
- Winchester, Hampshire, is specifically identified as Camelot by Thomas Malory. William Caxton, in his preface to Malory's book, said that the Round Table itself was at Winchester Castle, and that anyone who wished to see it could go there.
- Camelon, near Falkirk, which was spelled Camelo prior to the 19th century.
- Cadbury Castle, Somerset, an Iron Age hill fort referred to as a location for Camelot by John Leland in 1542. "At the very south end of the church of South-Cadbyri standeth Camallate, sometime a famous town or castle... The people can tell nothing there but that they have heard Arthur much resorted to Camalat..." A well on the ascent is known locally as Arthur's Well, and the highest part of the hill is known as Arthur's Palace, these names being recorded as early as the late 16th century.
- Colchester, a town in Essex (or its Roman antecedent Camulodunum), has been cited as one of the potential sites of Camelot. Though the name "Camelot" may be derived from Camulodunum (modern Colchester), the Iron Age capital of the Trinovantes, and later the provincial capital of Roman Britannia, its location close to England's east coast – and thus very close to the earliest Anglo-Saxon settlements – places it in the wrong Anglo-Saxon kingdom.
- The ex-Roman fort of Camboglanna on Hadrian's Wall.
- Campus Elleti in Glamorgan.
- Caerwent.
  - Llanmelin hill fort near Caerwent.
- Camelford, Cornwall.
- Camaret, Brittany, France.
- Saltwell Park in Gateshead.
- Viroconium, Shropshire.
- Chard, Somerset.
- Graig-Llwyn near Lisvane.
- Camlet Moat near Trent Park, by Enfield Chase, London.
- Slack, near Huddersfield; the Romans had a fort named Cambodunum here making the kingdom Elmet.
- Cadbury Camp, Somerset.
- Roxburgh Castle in the Scottish Borders, proposed by Alistair Moffat in his work Arthur and the Lost Kingdoms.
- Chester Castle.

== Avalon ==
- Isle of Aval in Brittany
- Glastonbury in England
- Sicily
- The Isle of Arran
- The city of Avallon in France
- The North Pole (according to the theories of William F. Warren)

== Reputed Arthurian battle sites ==
Twelve of Arthur's battles were recorded by Nennius in Historia Brittonum.

- Battle at the mouth of the river Glein (1st battle), possibly River Glen, Northumberland or River Glen, Lincolnshire.
- Battles of the river Dubglas (2nd, 3rd, 4th and 5th battles) in the region of Linnuis. Guesses for the river include the River Trent or the Ancholme. An alternative northern site is the Devil's Water at Linnels on Hadrian's Wall or the River Douglas, near Wigan. However, the strategic location of the River Douglas in Glen Douglas in Lennox, near the portage at Arrochar from Loch Long (the Loch of the Ships) to Loch Lomond, overlooked by Ben Arthur, make it the most likely location.
- Battle of the river of the Bassas (6th battle). Probably a reference to the Bass Rock in the Firth of Forth, although possibly also relates to the middle River Witham at Bassingham, the homestead of Bassa's people. An alternative northern location is at Bassington on the River Aln in Northumbria, not far from the River Glen.
- Battle of Cat Coit Celidon (7th battle), possibly Caledonian Woods in the Scottish Lowlands.
- Battle of Fort Guinnon (the White Fort) (8th battle). Possibly the Binchester Roman fort. Or Wedale in southern Scotland.
- Battle of the City of the Legion (9th battle) Hypothesized sites for this battle include:
  - Caerleon, also, according to Geoffrey of Monmouth, the site of Arthur's court and Guinevere's convent
  - Carlisle
  - Chester
  - York
- Battle of Tribruit (the 10th battle), possibly the mouth of the river Avon near Bo'ness, Scotland, or near Dumfries.
- Battle of Agned (the 11th battle), probably near Edinburgh as Mount Agned was another term for Edinburgh, although possibly at the Roman fort Bremenium, near Rochester, Northumberland
- Battle of Mons Badonicus c. AD 496 (12th battle). The date, location, and contestants of this battle are a matter of considerable debate. Hypothesized sites for Mons Badonicus include:
  - Bowden Hill in Linlithgow
  - Mynydd Baedan in South Wales
  - Badbury Rings, Dorset, an Iron Age hill fort
  - Bath or Solsbury Hill near Bath, suggested by Geoffrey of Monmouth
  - Buxton, Derbyshire, a hilltop town and the site of a Roman Bath
  - Liddington Castle, Wiltshire
  - Bardon Hill, Leicestershire
- Battle of Camlann (Arthur's last and fatal battle) possibly fought in South Somerset or at Camboglanna near the western section of Hadrian's Wall. Alternatively, it has been speculated that could have been fought at Camelon in Falkirkshire or Cwm Llan on Snowdon.

== Places with other associations to Arthurian legend ==
- Alderley Edge in Cheshire. Legend has it that beneath the hill in a cavern stretching the outcrop of sandstone, King Arthur and the knights of the round table lie sleeping.
- Alnwick Castle is a contender for Lancelot's Castle Joyous Garde according to Malory.
- The castle of Joyeuse Garde in La Forest-Landerneau.
  - Bamburgh Castle, an alternative contender to Alnwick Castle for Lancelot's Castle Joyous Garde (according to Malory)
- Astolat, Home of Elaine, the Lady of Shallot
- Arthur's Seat
- King Arthur's Stone, Swansea
- Arthur's Stone, Herefordshire
- The convent at Amesbury in Wiltshire has been suggested as the place of banishment of Guinevere.
- Brocéliande forest is in Brittany
- The Arthur's cave, the Arthur's Castle and the Castle of Morgane in Huelgoat
- Merlin's grave near Plounevez-Quintin
- Arthur's hill – the hill of Arthur's horse near Gourin in the French Black Mountains
- The lake of Viviane and Lancelot in Beaufort-en-Vallée, near Angers
- Carlisle: In Malory, Guinevere's affair with Lancelot was exposed at Carlisle and there she was sentenced to death.
- Carmarthen was the birthplace of Merlin according to Geoffrey of Monmouth. The name "Carmarthen" is the anglicised form of the Welsh name for the town, 'Caerfyrddin', which means "Merlin's fortress" ("Caer"-Fortress, "Myrddin"-Merlin). There are many places surrounding Carmarthen with names associating it with Merlin, such as Bryn Myrddin, "Merlin's Hill".
- Castle an Dinas in Cornwall, traditionally said to be a hunting lodge of Arthur; also said by William Worcester to be where "Tador Duke of Cornwall, husband of the mother of Arthur was slain".
- Castle Dore, the Cornish castle where the story of Tristan is set
- Carhaix, the city where Tristan got married
- Lake District in Cumbria, England is the likely location of Corbenic, the Grail Castle
- Dinas Emrys (Iron Age hill fort in Gwynedd said to have been a place of refuge of Vortigern and the site of Merlin's vision of the contest of the Red and White dragons).
- Drumelzier, Scottish Borders – purported burial site of Merlin
- Dumbarton Castle, Geoffrey of Monmouth's 'Alclud'
- King Arthur's Hall, an enclosure or henge situated on Bodmin Moor Cornwall
- Montségur in the French Pyrenees – associated with Cathar treasure; destination for Otto Rahn's 1930s and Otto Skorzeny's 1944 searches for the Holy Grail.
- Stonehenge – said to be the burial place of Ambrosius Aurelianus and of Uther Pendragon
- The Berth, near Baschurch in Shropshire, reputed to be a possible burial place
- Strait of Messina – related to Morgan le Fay
- Tintagel Castle in Cornwall, said to be Arthur's birthplace by Geoffrey of Monmouth. It is also said to be the stronghold of the Dukes and Duchesses of Cornwall, namely Duchess, then Queen, Igraine (Ygraine, Ygerna) and Duke Gorlois.
- Mount Etna, related to Morgan le Fay.
- Lothian – King Lot
- Orkney – King Lot
- Ben Arthur
- Chapelizod – home of Yseult

== Sources ==
- Hunt, A. (2005). The magic of the cauldron. Vortigern Studies.
- Hunt, A. (2005). From Glein to Camlann: The life and death of King Arthur. Vortigern Studies.
- Lloyd, Scott, The Arthurian Place Names of Wales, University of Wales Press, Cardiff, 2017 ISBN 978-1-78683-025-8
- Robert Rouse and Cory Rushton, The Medieval Quest for Arthur, Tempus, Stroud, 2005 ISBN 0-7524-3343-1
