= Class 5MT =

Class 5MT is a steam locomotive power classification used by the London, Midland and Scottish Railway and British Railways. It applied to number of different locomotive classes including:

- LMS Stanier Class 5 4-6-0
- BR Standard Class 5
