= Château de Joyeuse Garde =

Castle ruins in Brittany, France

Coordinates: 48.4242°N 4.3162°W

The Château de Joyeuse Garde is the site of a castle associated with Joyous Gard from Arthurian legend. Its ruins in the town of La Forest-Landerneau in Brittany date to the 6th century. It was listed as a monument historique on 6 October 1975.

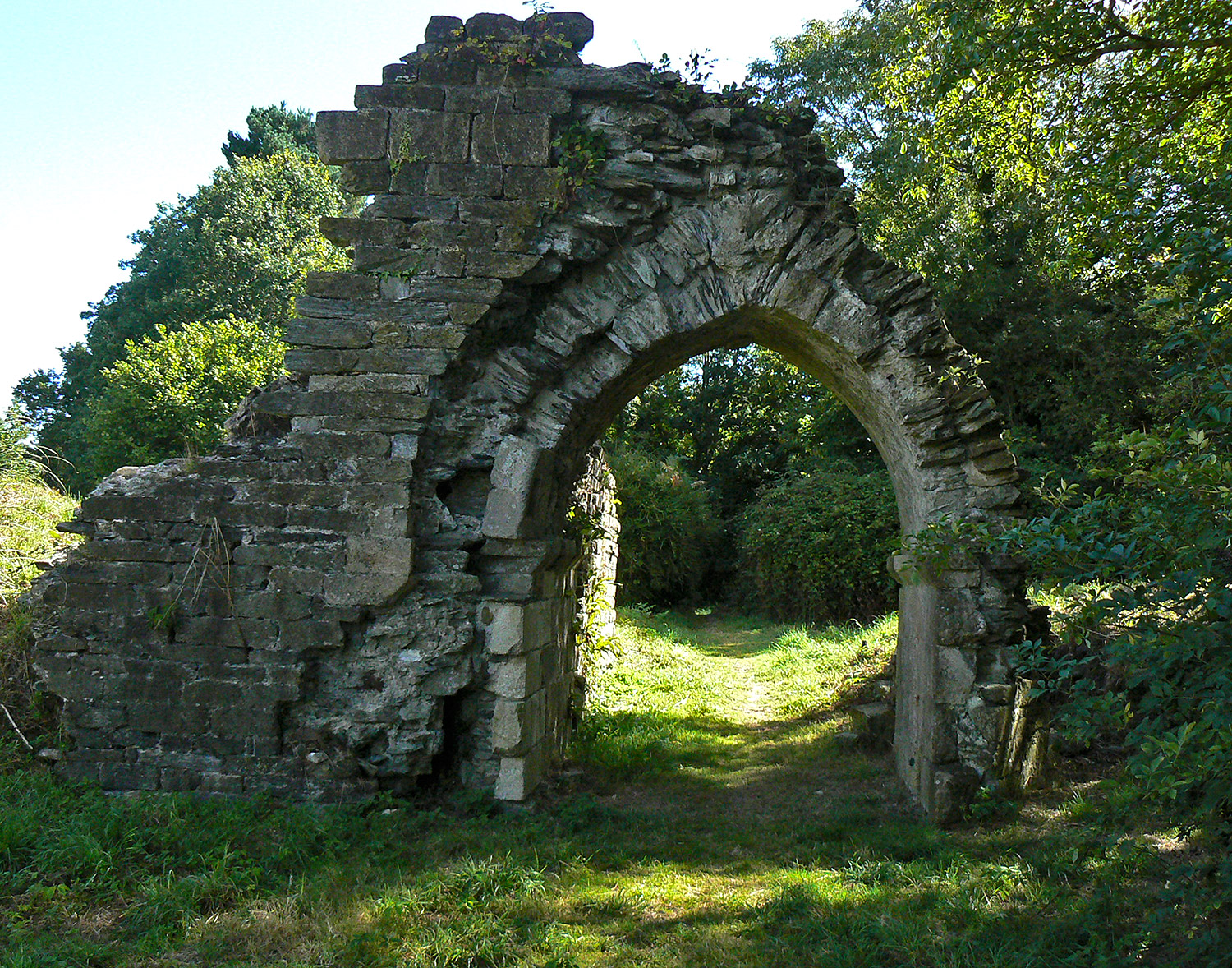
Château de Joyeuse Garde

The castle is the subject of "Joyeuse Garde", an 1859 poem by Algernon Charles Swinburne.

== Gallery ==
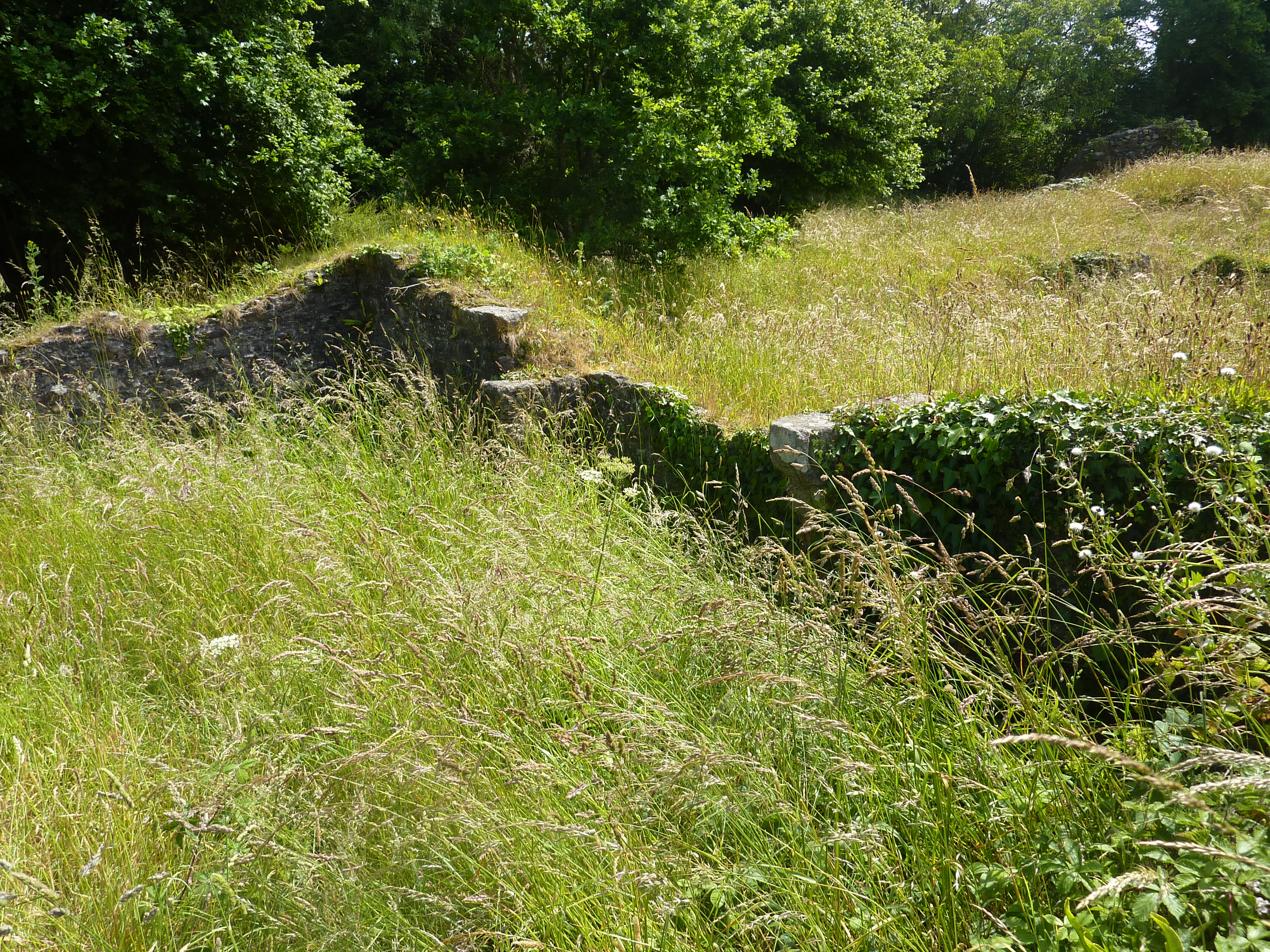
Ruined castle's wall

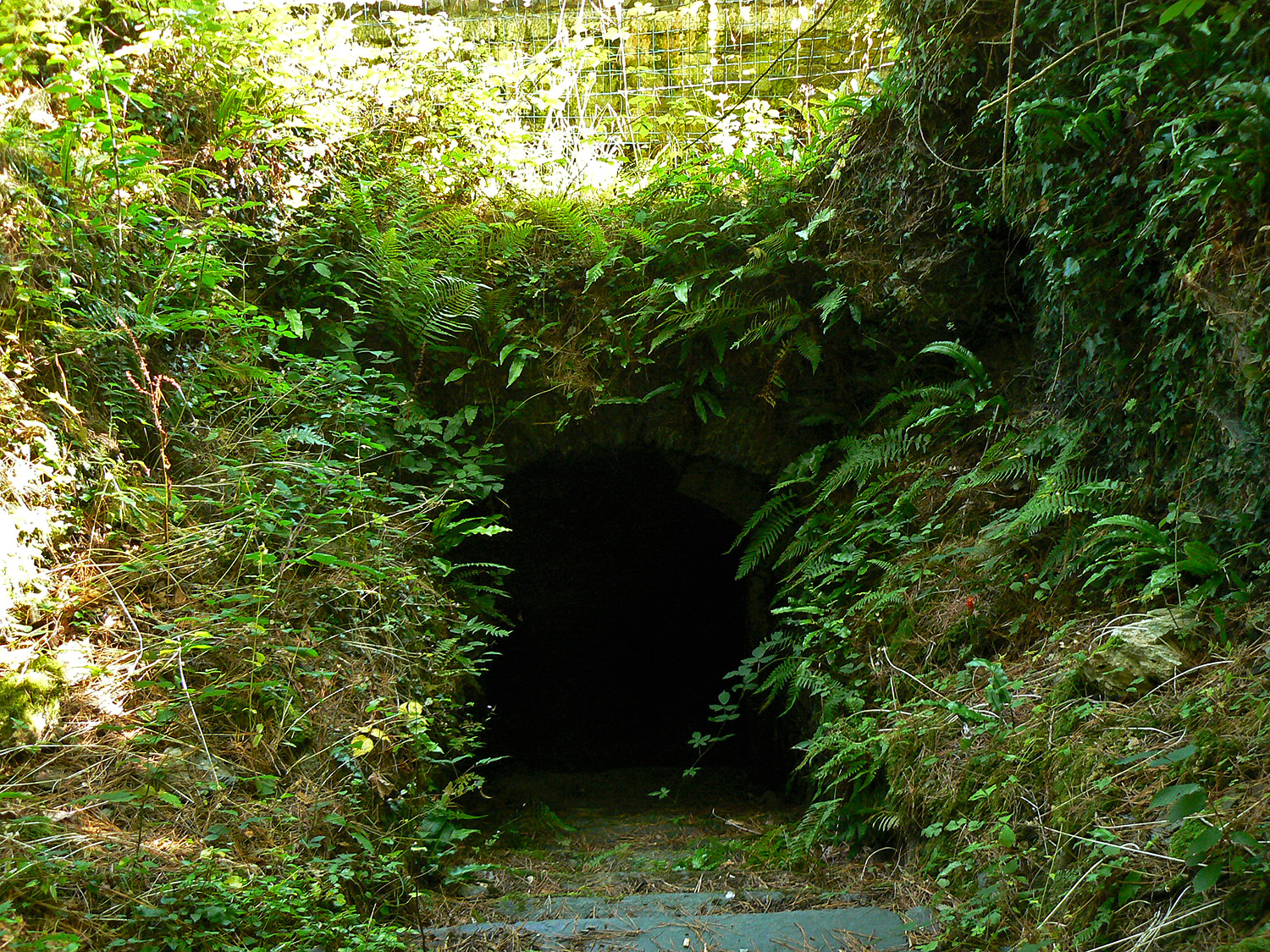
Entrance to underground area

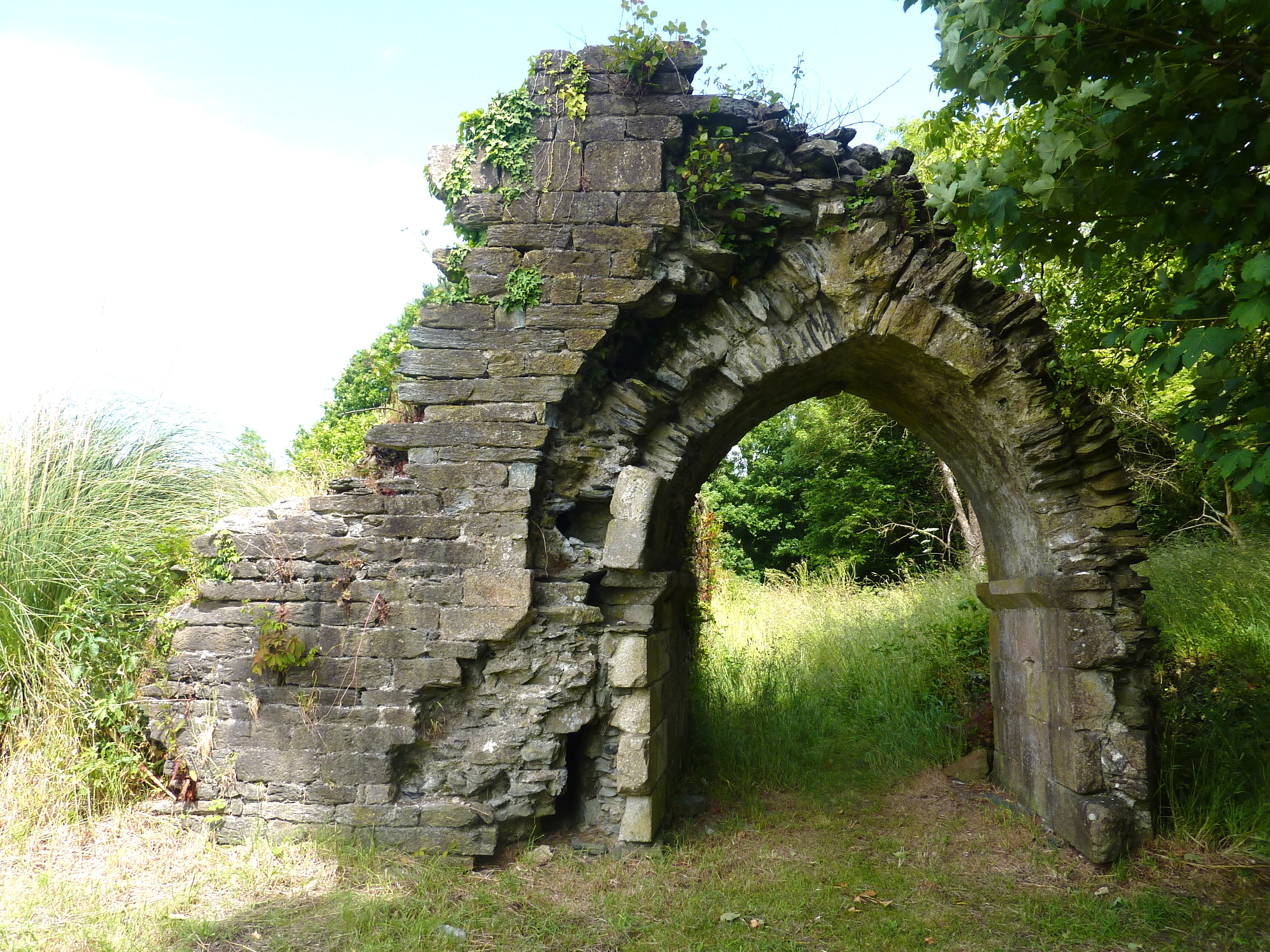
Arch of Château de Joyeuse Garde
