= Celliwig =

Welsh spelling of the earliest location of King Arthur's court

Celliwig, Kelliwic or Gelliwic is perhaps the earliest named location for the court of King Arthur. It may be translated as 'forest grove'.

== Literary references ==
It is mentioned in the Welsh tale Culhwch and Olwen whose manuscript dates from the 11th century, though the story is much older. The story describes the court as being at Celliwig in Cernyw (the Welsh name for Cornwall), otherwise known as the kingdom of Dumnonia including modern Devon. The hall is guarded by Glewlwyd Gafaelfawr, Arthur's porter, and Culhwch has difficulty gaining entrance due to the special laws that restrict entry once a feast has begun. Though there is no description of the place the implications of the story are of great wealth and splendour. It describes Arthur's warriors at the court in depth and says that: "From here, one of his Warband, Drem, could see a gnat as far away as Scotland; while another, Medyr, could shoot an arrow through the legs of a wren in Ireland!"

Some of the Trioedd Ynys Prydein (or Welsh Triads) mention Arthur and "Three Tribal Thrones of the Island of Britain" and locate one of his courts at Celliwig: "Arthur as Chief Prince in Celliwig in Cernyw, and Bishop Bytwini as Chief Bishop, and Caradog Freichfras as Chief Elder."

Caradoc was his chief elder at this court and that Bishop Bytwini or Bedwin was chief bishop. This is one of the early triads found in Peniarth MS 54 reflecting information recorded before Geoffrey of Monmouth. The same triad goes on to say Arthur's other courts were at Mynyw and Pen Rhionydd. The triads also state that at Celliwig Mordred struck Gwenhwyfar a blow. This may have led to the Battle of Camlann. The early Welsh poem Pa gŵr yw'r porthor? may also mention the court.

Celliwig was also known to the Cornish, as it appears as Kyllywyc in the Cornish-language play Beunans Ke, written perhaps around 1500. In the Iolo Manuscripts (1843), a corpus of pseudo-medieval Welsh texts by the renowned literary forger and inventor of tradition Iolo Morganwg (1747–1826), Celliwig is referred as the former site of the "throne of Cornwall" but the text adds that it is now at Caervynyddawg (Caerfynyddog), a site which is otherwise unattested.

== Location ==
- A 1302 Cornish legal record mentions a 'Thomas de Kellewik' from west Cornwall, though his exact place of origin is unknown. Translated into SWF Cornish this would be kelli gwik meaning "woods town" cognate with Latin uicus and Saxon wich.
- Celliwig was identified by some Cornish antiquaries from 1816 onwards with Callington (occasionally locally attested as 'Callywith') where the ancient monuments of Castlewich Henge and Cadson Bury are in close proximity. Their influence gave Callington its modern name in Common Cornish; Kelly Bray (Cornish: Kellibregh, 'dappled grove') is located just to the north. An early Roman fort was discovered in the vicinity at Calstock in 2008.
- Rachel Bromwich, editor of the Welsh Triads, matched it to Kelly Rounds, a hill fort in the Cornish parish of Egloshayle. This had already been suggested by Charles Henderson in the Cornish Church Guide (1925) (p. 87).
- The Ravenna Cosmography identifies a major regional Roman-era settlement as Nemetostatio in central Dumnonia (identified with North Tawton, Devon) which would translate from Latin as 'The Outpost of the Sacred Grove(s)'.
- Not far away from the modern Cornish border is the village of Kelly in Devon which takes its name from an ancient local family, attested as far back as the 11th century.

=== Outside Cornwall ===
- However, there are also a number of places called Cernyw or containing that name in Wales, e.g. the place name Coedkernew (Coed Cernyw) in Newport. So it has been suggested that this court might be the hillfort of Llanmelin, near Caerwent. Caradog's connection to the Kingdom of Gwent might support this idea.
- There is also a farm called Gelliweg on the Llŷn peninsula in Gwynedd which one pair of Arthurian researchers and writers, Steven Blake and Scott Lloyd, argue may be the location.
- Kernev/Cornouaille is a region in Brittany with close cultural ties to Cornwall and Wales and the continental source for the Matter of Britain.

=== Celliwic as a fictional place ===
Those who argue that Arthur is a mythic figure also suggest this court is entirely fictional. Given that the name means "forest grove... it may have originally been envisaged as somewhere Otherworldly (sacred groves being common in Celtic myth) and only later might a specific location have been ascribed to it."

== See also ==
- Sites and places associated with Arthurian legend
- Historicity of King Arthur
