= BR Standard Class 5 73096 =

Preserved British steam locomotive

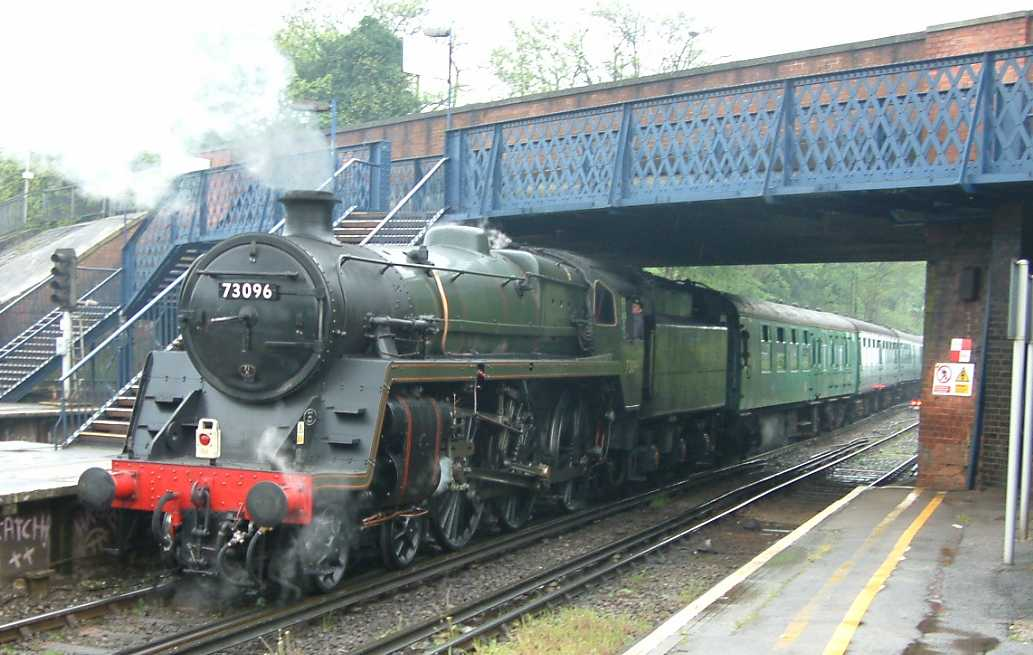
- 73096 at Virginia Water station
Type and origin
- Power type: Steam
- Builder: Derby Works
- Build date: November 1955
Specifications
- Configuration
  - UIC: 2′C h2
- Gauge: 4 ft 8 1/2 in (1,435 mm)
- Leading dia.: 3 ft 0 in (0.914 m)
- Driver dia.: 6 ft 2 in (1.880 m)
- Length: 62 ft 7 in (19.08 m)
- Width: 8 ft 9 in (2.67 m)
- Height: 13 ft 0 in (3.96 m)
- Axle load: 19.70 long tons (20.02 t; 22.06 short tons)
- Adhesive weight: 58.05 long tons (58.98 t; 65.02 short tons)
- Loco weight: 76.00 long tons (77.22 t; 85.12 short tons)
- Tender type: BR1G
Career
- Operators: British Railways
- Power class: 5MT
- Numbers: 73096
- Withdrawn: 30 November 1967
- Disposition: Store, Ropley

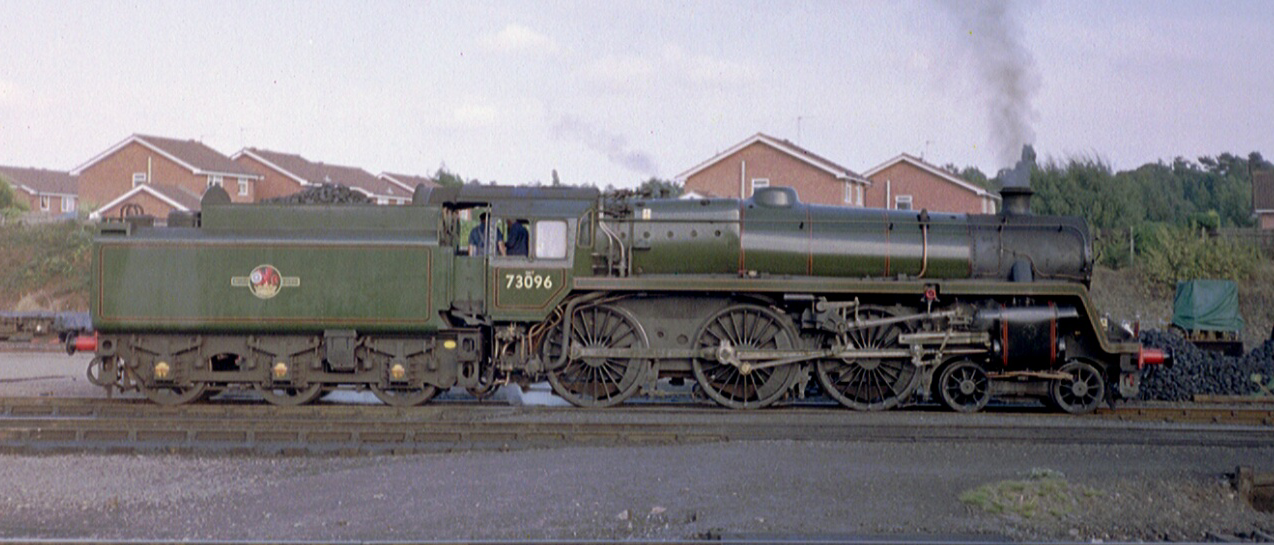
73096 at the Severn Valley Railway in 2003

British Railways Standard Class 5 No. 73096 is a preserved British steam locomotive, unnamed in service. It has spent most of its time in preservation (since 1985) in the care of the Watercress Line (Mid-Hants Railway).

== BR Operation ==
73096 was built at British Railways' Derby Works in November 1955 and was used on the London Midland and Western Regions of British Railways. It was withdrawn from service at Patricroft depot in the north west of England in November 1967 and sold to Woodham Brothers scrapyard based in Barry, South Wales.

Location	Shedcode	Date
Patricroft	10C	25 November 1955
Shrewsbury	84G	6 September 1958
Gloucester Barnwood	85C	14 July 1962
Gloucester Horton Road	85B	4 May 1964
Oxley	2B	1 November 1964
Nuneaton	5E	6 March 1965
Croes Newydd	6C	19 June 1965
Patricroft	9H	24 July 1965
Withdrawn		25 November 1967

== Preservation ==
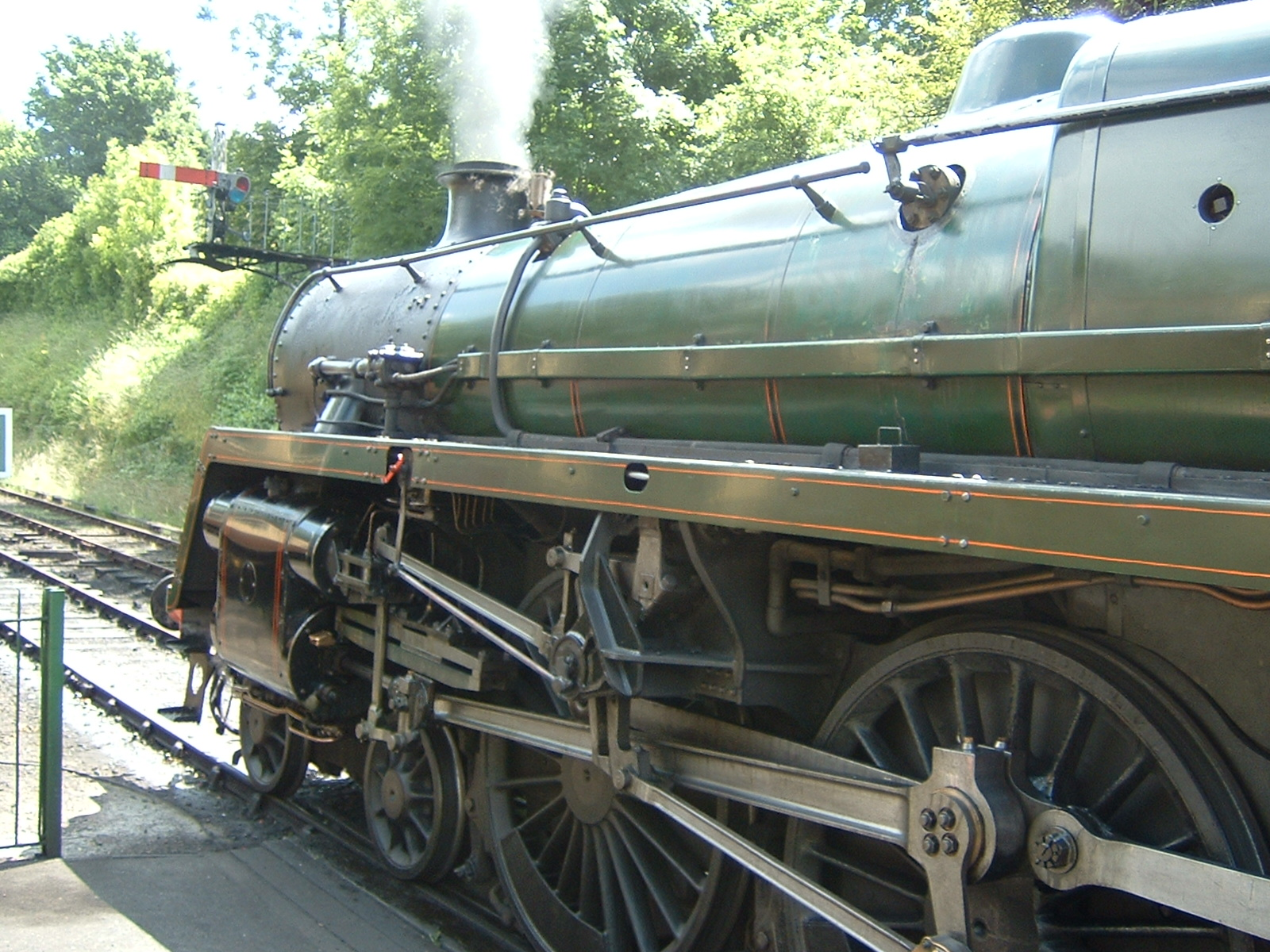
73096 at Alresford station

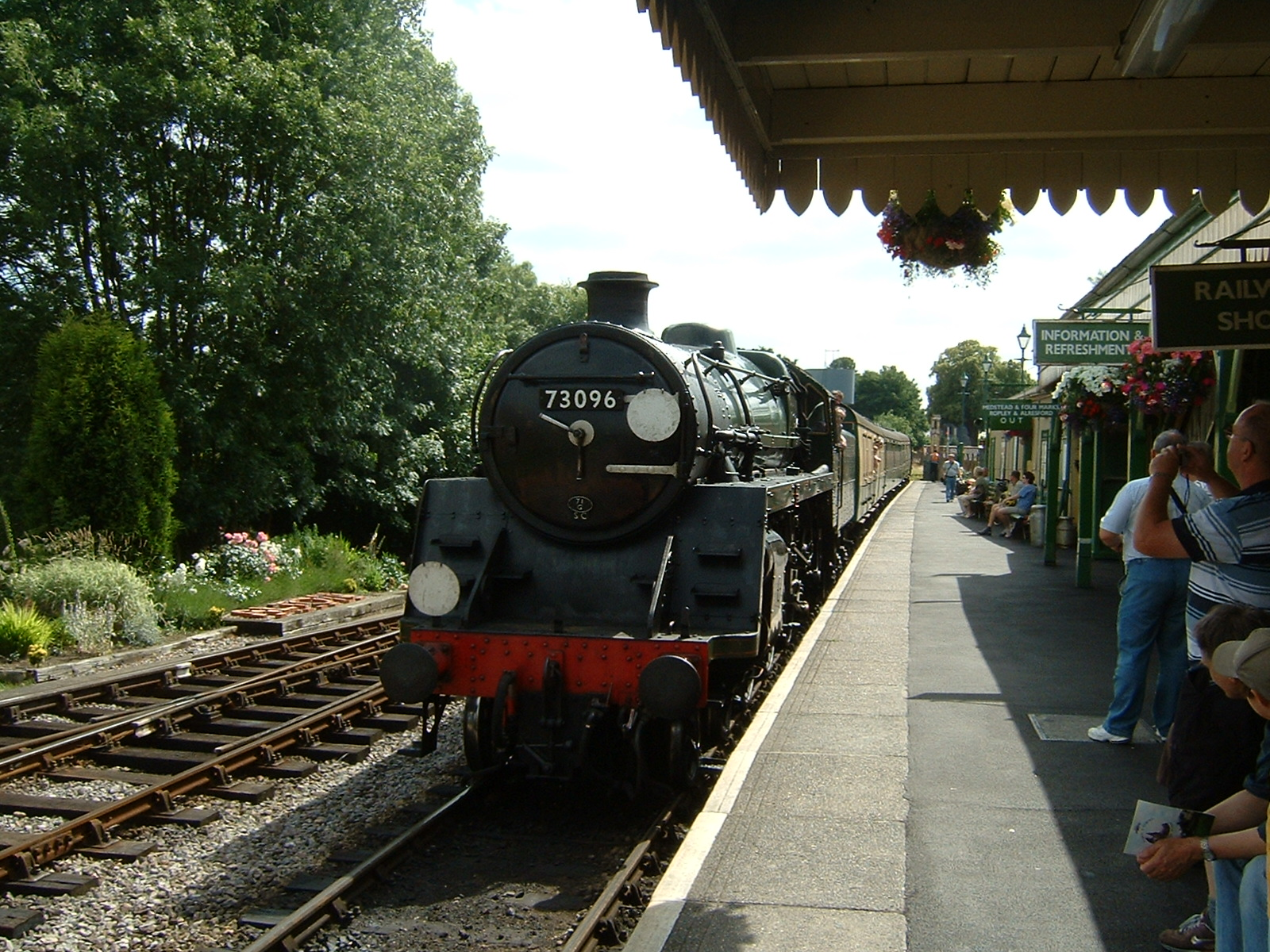
73096 arriving at Alton station

Rescued from the scrapyard in July 1985 by Hampshire-based businessman John Bunch, 73096 was returned to service in October 1993 by the Mid-Hants Railway on the Watercress Line, following major boiler overhaul and the construction of a new tender, based on the chassis from an LMS Jubilee Class tender, to a to BR1G style.

Operated on the Watercress Line between Alresford and Alton in its new lease of life, 73096 has been temporarily disguised as 73080 Merlin and as 73054, for special events and commemorations.

In September 2011, its boiler certificate expired and 73096 was consequently withdrawn from service. It left the Mid-Hants for Southall in late 2014. In November 2017, 73096 was purchased by the Mid-Hants-Railway and returned to Ropley for assessment and overhaul. In 2018 it was suggested that the locomotive could be back in steam by 2025.

=== Cylinder failure ===
The engine suffered over £200,000 worth of damage during the 14 March 2009 Spring Steam Gala services on the Mid-Hants Railway. Whilst on the first Alresford to Alton service of the day, 73096 suffered major damage to its left-hand (driver's-side) cylinder at Wander's Curve in the Ropley to Medstead section, about ¾ of a mile from Ropley station. It is thought a piston core-plug worked loose thus causing much damage to the cylinder covers, cylinder, piston and piston-rod plus other equipment in the area. There is no evidence that this was caused by priming (water in the cylinders, which can cause similar catastrophic failures) and the crew were absolved of any blame at the time of the incident.

No damage was done to the track or signalling, but No. 73096 blocked the line for some time. Shuttle services were quickly organised between Alresford and Ropley and between Alton and Medstead, until the line could be cleared. Parts of the steam locomotive's 'motion' (connecting rod, valve gear linkages etc.) on the driver's side had to be removed by motive power depot staff to allow the locomotive to be moved. As the 5MT was unable to move under its own power, a diesel locomotive was dispatched from Ropley engine shed to retrieve it. The Gala thereafter continued with a revised timetable.

A replacement cylinder casting was required, necessitating a new pattern made. As of the week commencing 9 August 2010, the locomotive was running again, hauling services on the line masquerading as Henry during the 'Day Out with Thomas' event.

== See also ==
- Watercress Line

In 2013 the locomotive was collected and delivered to Dorset Steam Fair to raise awareness (and money) to have it repaired. Famous train transport firm Allelys transported the loco which was the subject of a 2013 programme on Yesterday Channel called Steam Truckers. Repeated several times.
