= BR Standard Class 5 73082 Camelot =

Preserved British 4-6-0 locomotive

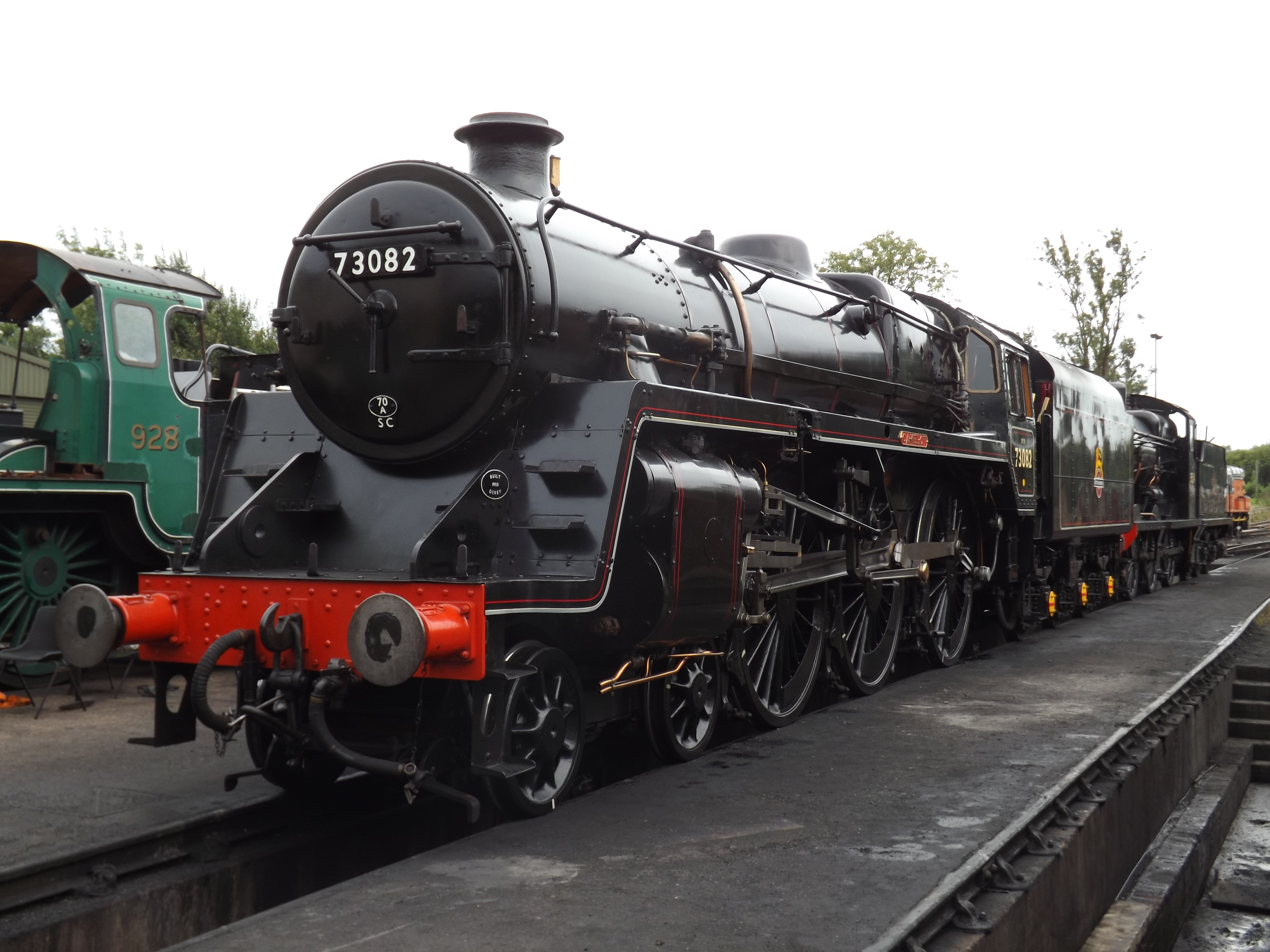
- 73082 on shed at Sheffield Park.
Type and origin
- Power type: Steam
- Builder: Derby Works
- Build date: June 1955
Specifications
- Configuration
  - UIC: 2′C h2
- Gauge: 4 ft 8 1/2 in (1,435 mm)
- Leading dia.: 3 ft 0 in (0.914 m)
- Driver dia.: 6 ft 2 in (1.880 m)
- Length: 62 ft 7 in (19.08 m)
- Width: 8 ft 9 in (2.67 m)
- Height: 13 ft 0 in (3.96 m)
- Axle load: 19.70 long tons (20.02 t; 22.06 short tons)
- Adhesive weight: 58.05 long tons (58.98 t; 65.02 short tons)
- Loco weight: 76.00 long tons (77.22 t; 85.12 short tons)
- Tender type: BR1B
- Fuel type: Coal
Career
- Operators: British Railways
- Power class: 5MT
- Numbers: 73082
- Withdrawn: 19 June 1966
- Restored: 1995
- Disposition: Operational

No. 73082 Camelot is a preserved British Railways Standard Class 5 4-6-0 based on the Bluebell Railway in Sussex, England, and owned by the 73082 Camelot Locomotive Society. It was outshopped from Derby Works in 1955, and worked on the Southern Region of British Railways. In August 1959, it received the name Camelot from withdrawn Urie King Arthur Class engine no. 30742.

== Withdrawal ==
In 1966, the locomotive was sent to Woodham Brothers for scrapping. It languished at Barry Docks until 1979 when purchased by the 73082 Camelot Locomotive Society, and moved to the Bluebell Railway for restoration alongside Battle of Britain Pacific 34059 Sir Archibald Sinclair.

== Restoration and operation on the Bluebell Railway ==
73082 returned to steam in 1995 after a protracted overhaul at Sheffield Park and put in almost ten years of service on the Bluebell Railway until withdrawal for a ten year overhaul in June 2005.

Camelot returned to service on the Bluebell Railway for the second time on 25 October 2015. On 18 September 2018, Camelot made its first visit away from the Bluebell Railway, being hauled to the West Somerset Railway for their Autumn Steam Gala, being hauled over the mainline by Class 37 diesel 37 668, returning on 1 October in the same way.
