= BR Standard Class 5 =

Steam locomotive class

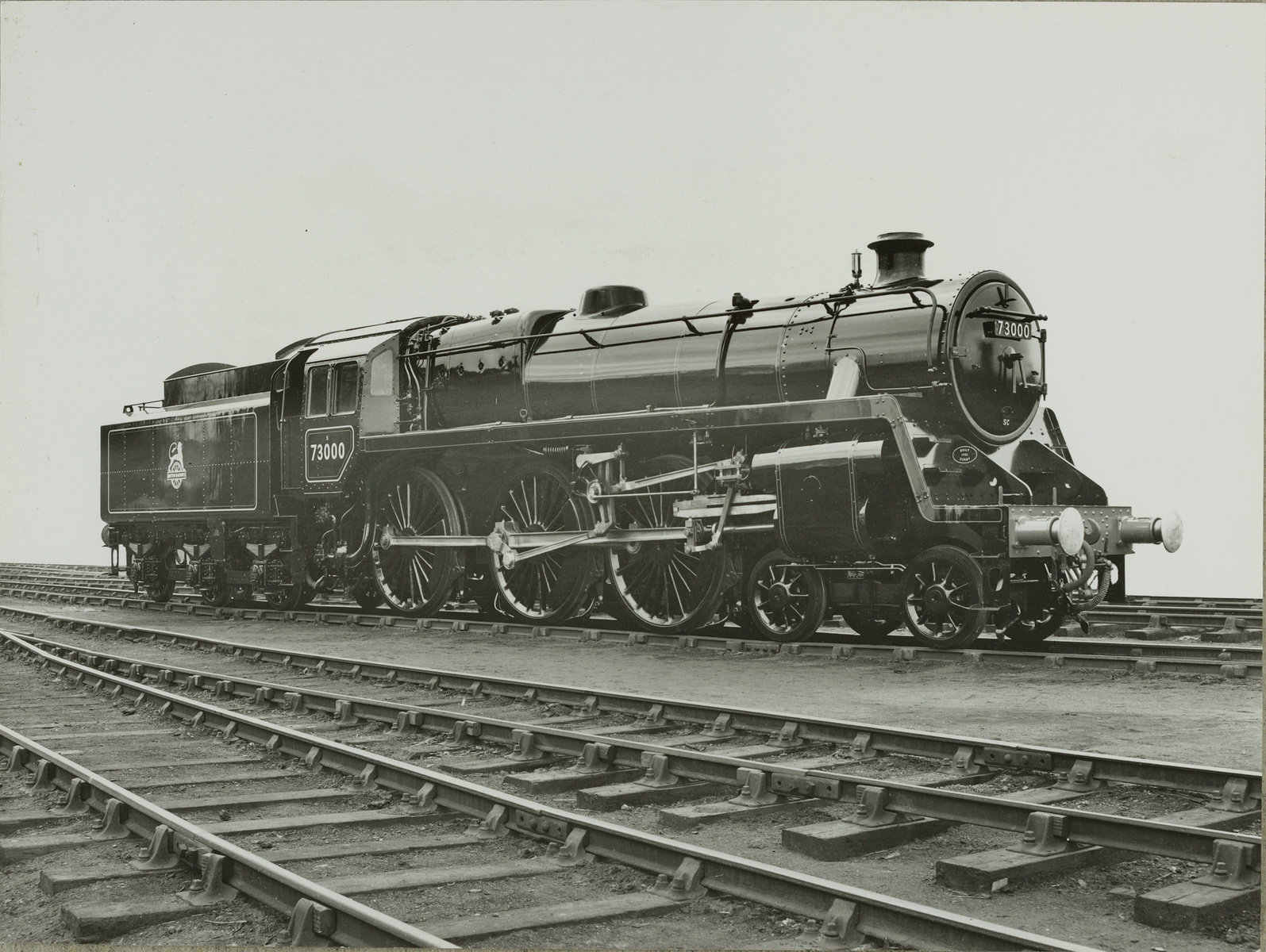
- British Railways standard class 5MT No. 73000 in 1952.
Type and origin
- Power type: Steam
- Designer: R. A. Riddles
- Builder: BR Derby Works (130); BR Doncaster Works (42)
- Build date: April 1951 - June 1957
- Total produced: 172
Specifications
- Configuration
  - Whyte: 4-6-0
  - UIC: 2′C h2
- Gauge: 4 ft 8 1/2 in (1,435 mm)
- Leading dia.: 3 ft 0 in (0.914 m)
- Driver dia.: 6 ft 2 in (1.880 m)
- Length: 62 ft 7 in (19.08 m)
- Width: 8 ft 9 in (2.67 m)
- Height: 13 ft 0 in (3.96 m)
- Axle load: 19.70 long tons (20.02 t; 22.06 short tons)
- Adhesive weight: 58.05 long tons (58.98 t; 65.02 short tons)
- Loco weight: 76.00 long tons (77.22 t; 85.12 short tons)
- Tender weight: BR1/BR1H: 49.15 long tons (49.94 t; 55.05 short tons); BR1B: 51.25 long tons (52.07 t; 57.40 short tons); BR1C: 53.25 long tons (54.10 t; 59.64 short tons); BR1F: 55.25 long tons (56.14 t; 61.88 short tons); BR1G: 52.50 long tons (53.34 t; 58.80 short tons);
- Tender type: BR1 (50), BR1B (62), BR1C (35), BR1F (10), BR1G (3), BH1H (12)
- Fuel capacity: BR1C: 9.00 long tons (9.14 t; 10.08 short tons); All others: 7.00 long tons (7.11 t; 7.84 short tons)
- Water cap.: BR1/BR1H: 4,250 imp gal (19,300 L; 5,100 US gal); BR1B/BR1C: 4,725 imp gal (21,480 L; 5,674 US gal); BR1F: 5,625 imp gal (25,570 L; 6,755 US gal); BR1G: 5,000 imp gal (23,000 L; 6,000 US gal)
- Firebox
  - Grate area: 28.7 sq ft (2.67 m^{2})
- Boiler: BR3
- Boiler pressure: 225 psi (1.55 MPa)
- Heating surface
  - Firebox: 171 sq ft (15.9 m^{2})
  - Tubes and flues: 1,479 sq ft (137.4 m^{2})
- Superheater
  - Heating area: 358 sq ft (33.3 m^{2})
- Cylinders: Two, outside
- Cylinder size: 19 in × 28 in (483 mm × 711 mm)
- Valve gear: Walschaerts (73000–73124, 73155–73171); Caprotti (73125–73154)
Performance figures
- Tractive effort: 26,124 lbf (116.2 kN)
- Factor of adh.: 4.98
Career
- Operators: British Railways
- Power class: 5MT
- Numbers: 73000–73171
- Axle load class: Route availability 7 BR (WR): Red
- Withdrawn: February 1964 – August 1968
- Disposition: Five preserved, remainder scrapped

The British Railways Standard Class 5MT 4-6-0 is one of the 12 BR standard classes of steam locomotive built by British Railways in the 1950s. It was essentially a development of the LMS Stanier Class 5 4-6-0 ("Black Five"). A total of 172 were built between 1951 and 1957.

== Background ==
William Stanier's Black Five had been the most successful mixed-traffic type in Great Britain. Construction of the Black Fives had started in 1934 and continued past nationalisation to 1951. A new set of 'standard' locomotives was to be built by British Railways, based on LMS designs and incorporating modern ideas.

In particular, the Standard design incorporated features designed to make disposal of the engine after a working "turn" easier: a self-cleaning smokebox and a rocking grate removed the necessity for crews to undertake dirty and strenuous duties at the end of a long shift. This was a necessary investment with the ever-increasing costs of labour following the Second World War.

The original design proposal for the class 5 locomotive had a 4-6-2 wheel arrangement, similar in concept to the Bulleid Light Pacifics that performed impressively during the 1948 Locomotive Exchanges. However this was deemed unnecessarily large and costly for a class 5 power requirement, so the successful LMS Class 5 4-6-0 design was used as the basis instead. The pacific design went on to be enlarged and used for the BR Standard Class 6.

== Design and construction ==
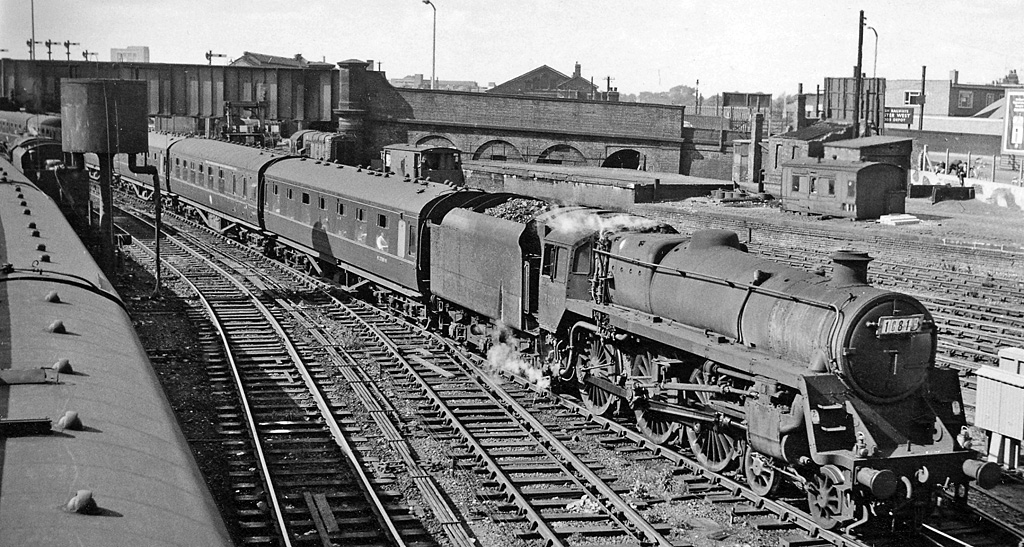
73140 with Caprotti valve gear and a big tender at Chester General in 1964.

The design work was done at the ex-LNER Doncaster Works but the bulk of the construction was done at Derby Works. The locomotive featured a BR standard boiler very similar in dimensions to the Stanier Type 3B fitted to the Black Fives, but made from manganese steel instead of nickel steel. The most obvious visible changes were a higher running plate, slightly enlarged driving wheels (from 6 ft 0 in (1,830 mm) to 6 ft 2 in (1,880 mm)), increased cylinder bore (from 18 1/2 to 19 in (470 to 480 mm)), a standard cab with external pipework and the regulator gland on the driver's side of the boiler below the dome. Many of these changes were to reduce maintenance or to incorporate standard components that could be shared between other standard classes.

The first of the class, 73000, was outshopped from Derby in April 1951 and 30 were in service by January 1952. There was then a gap in construction before Derby resumed building its remaining 100 engines. 42 were built at Doncaster, starting in August 1955 and finishing in May 1957, with Derby's last engine following a month later. 30 engines, numbers 73125 to 73154, were built with Caprotti valve gear and poppet valves.

Table of orders
Number	Date	Builder	Tender	Valve gear	Notes
73000–29	1951	Derby	BR1	Walschaerts	25 for LMR, 5 for ScR
73030–49	1953	Derby	BR1	Walschaerts	10 for LMR, 10 for ScR
73050–52	1954	Derby	BR1G	Walschaerts	for SR (S&DJR)
73053–64	1954	Derby	BR1H	Walschaerts	10 for LMR, 2 for ScR
73065–71	1954	Derby	BR1C	Walschaerts	for LMR
73072–79	1955	Derby	BR1C	Walschaerts	3 for LMR, 5 for ScR
73080–89	1955	Derby	BR1B	Walschaerts	for SR
73090–99	1955	Derby	BR1C	Walschaerts	for LMR
73100–09	1955	Doncaster	BR1B	Walschaerts	for ScR
73110–19	1955	Doncaster	BR1F	Walschaerts	for SR
73120–-24	1956	Doncaster	BR1B	Walschaerts	for ScR
73125–34	1956	Derby	BR1B	Caprotti	Poppet valves; for WR
75135–44	1956	Derby	BR1C	Caprotti	Poppet valves; for LMR
73145–54	1957	Derby	BR1B	Caprotti	Poppet valves; for ScR
73155–59	1956	Doncaster	BR1B	Walschaerts	for ER
73159-71	1957	Doncaster	BR1B	Walschaerts	for NER

== In service ==
These locomotives had a trouble-free introduction in comparison to several of the other Standard classes and were used interchangeably with the pre-nationalisation class 5 engines they supplemented. They were utilised on duties varying from fast passenger trains to slow unfitted freight trains, displaying their versatility.

Different regional allocations had differing tender designs, with locomotives assigned to the Southern Region having tenders with high water capacity to make up for the lack of water troughs.

Like the "Clan" class locomotives, the Standard 5s, with their high-stepped running board, were partly conceived to be more economical and serviceable replacements for the Bulleid Pacific. The Standard 5s could also run quite fast, with many drivers claiming they could easily reach just under 100 mph (160 km/h). Like the Clans, which could only manage one more carriage on an express than a 'Five', it took footplate crews time to get accustomed to them. They began reaching full potential when different firing techniques to let them steam using lower quality coal were developed. They pulled much of the traffic on the last express lines for steam in the mid and late 1960s, such as Edinburgh-Aberdeen, London- Southampton-Bournemouth- Weymouth and local express traffic in the North and Midlands around Sheffield and Leeds. They were also used on the locals between Liverpool, Manchester and Blackpool, some lasting to the very end of steam in 1968.

== Naming ==
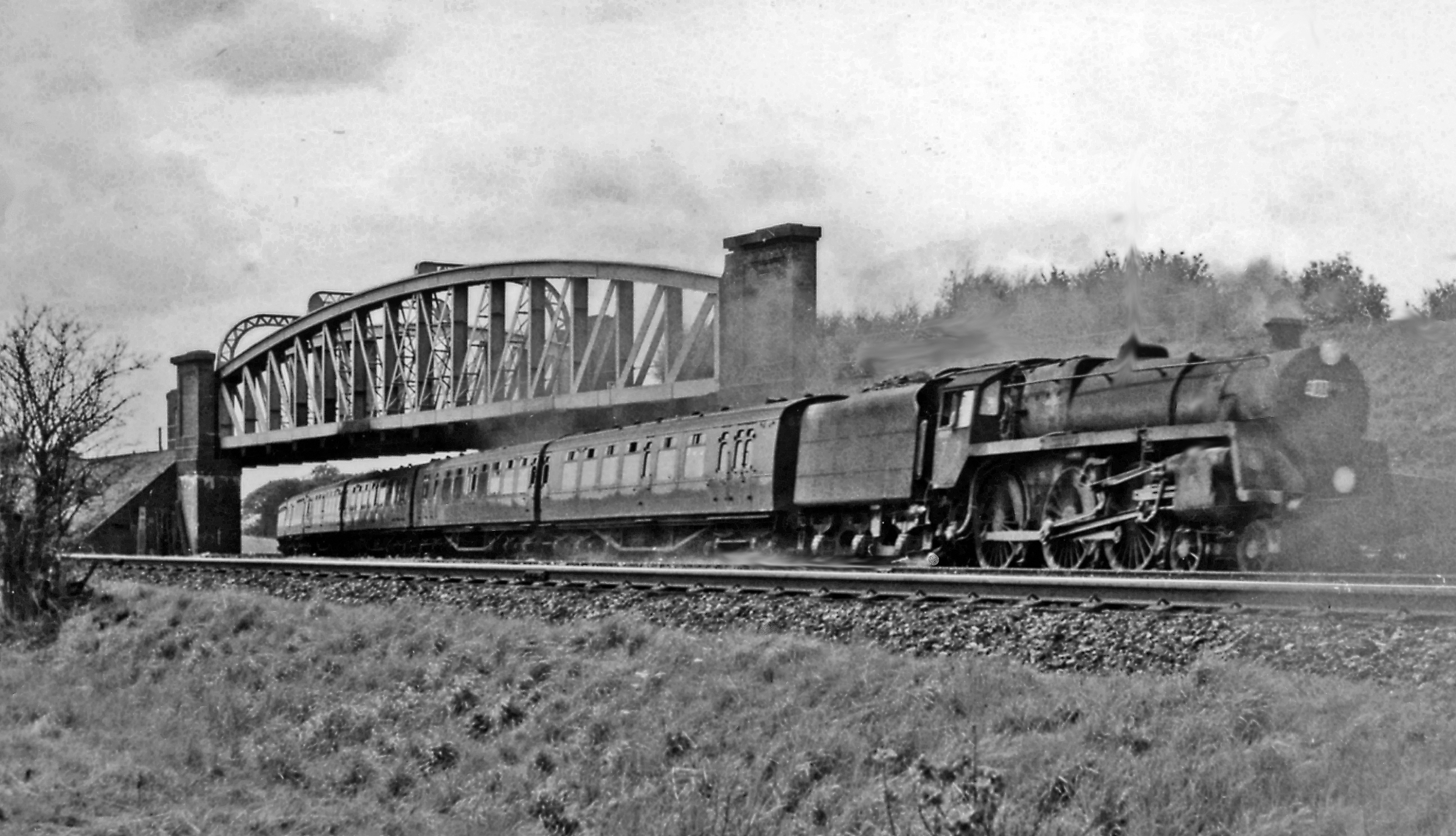
Named Class 5MT, No. 73113 Lyonesse at Battledown flyover. The nameplate is positioned above the centre driving wheel.

In 1959, 20 of the Southern Region locomotives were named, the names being transferred from SR King Arthur class locos that were then being withdrawn. These were:

- 73080 Merlin
- 73081 Excalibur
- 73082 Camelot
- 73083 Pendragon
- 73084 Tintagel
- 73085 Melisande
- 73086 The Green Knight
- 73087 Linette
- 73088 Joyous Gard
- 73089 Maid of Astolat
- 73110 The Red Knight
- 73111 King Uther
- 73112 Morgan Le Fay
- 73113 Lyonnesse
- 73114 Etarre
- 73115 King Pellinore
- 73116 Iseult
- 73117 Vivien
- 73118 King Leodegrance
- 73119 Elaine

== Withdrawal ==
Table of withdrawals
Year	Quantity in service at start of year	Quantity withdrawn	Locomotive numbers	Notes
1964	172	15	73012/17/24/27/46–47/52/58/61/74/76, 73109/16/61/64.	
1965	157	43	73001/03/08/15/21/23/30–32/36/38/41–42/44/49/51/54/56/62–63/68/75/77/84/90–91, 73103–04/06/11–12/22–24/47–48/52/62–63/65–68.	
1966	114	38	73005/07/09/13/16/28/55/57/72/78/80–83/86–89/95/98–99, 73101–02/05/07–08/14/20–21/45/49–51/53–54/69–71.	
1967	76	53	73002/04/06/11/14/18–20/22/25–26/29/37/39/43/45/48/59–60/64–66/70–71/73/79/85/92–94/96–97, 73100/10/13/15/17–19/27/29–30/37/39–41/44/46/55–56/58–60.	
1968	23	23	73000/10/33–35/40/50/53/67/69, 73125–26/28/31–36/38/42–43/57.	

== Accidents and incidents ==
- On 25 August 1958, locomotive No. 73042 was hauling a sleeper car train which overran a signal and was in a head-on collision with a train formed from two electric multiple units at Eastbourne, East Sussex. Five people were killed and 40 were injured.
- In 1958, locomotive No. 73111 was hauling a passenger train that derailed at Millbrook, Hampshire due to a faulty point motor moving a set of points under the train.

== Variations & proposed changes ==
The main variation across the class was the valve gear, with 142 using Walschaerts valve gear and the remaining 30 using British Caprotti valve gear. There was little difference in performance between the two groups, but the Caprotti fitted engines had a reputation for being good performers at higher speeds. There was potential for more BR standard locomotives to have Caprotti valve gear fitted as it allowed for longer periods between inspections, offsetting the higher initial cost of this valve gear.

Doncaster had designed double chimneys for the class, similar to the ones used on several of the BR Standard Class 4 4-6-0. If applied, this would have improved the draughting and increased the efficiency of the locomotives. With the Modernisation Plan of 1955 and the good performance of the class from the outset, these plans were shelved permanently.

Another proposal was to produce freight locomotives based from this design in response to criticism by the Western Region on the BR Standard Class 9F. The management believed that the 9Fs were too large and powerful for most heavy freight traffic, along with being far more expensive to build and operate than the older 2-8-0 locomotives they supplemented. In response to this, the British Transport Commission drew a 2-8-0 Class 8F based on the Standard Class 5, like the LMS class 5 and 8Fs. Changes included a higher boiler pressure of 250 psi and driving wheels 5 ft 0 in (1.52 m) in diameter to increase tractive effort. Preparations were made for series production to begin, but the work ceased after the Modernisation Plan was published.

== Preservation ==
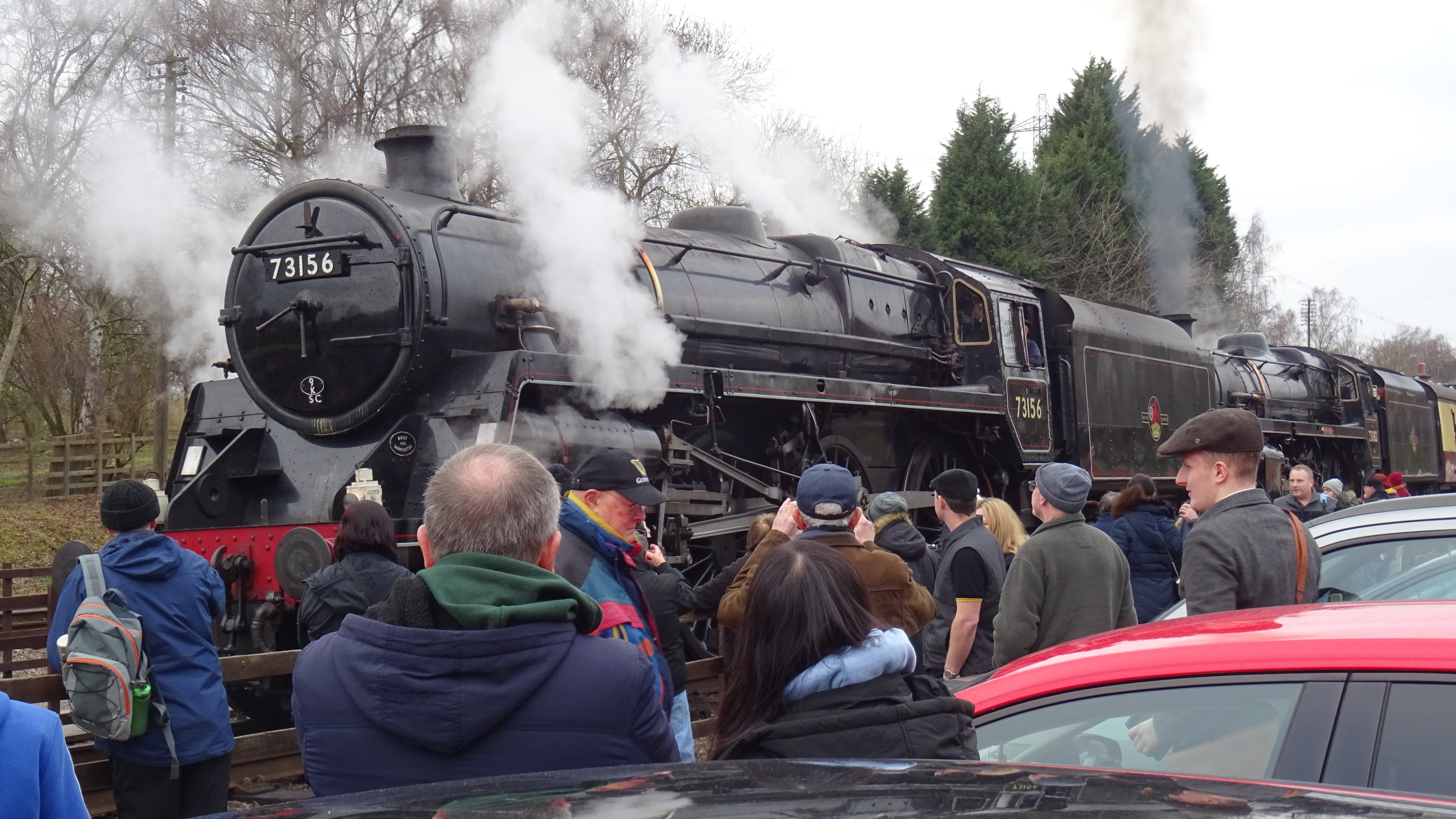
73156 and 73082 doubleheading a train at the Great Central Railway in January 2023.

Five members of the class survive and all have steamed in preservation with examples from both builders. 73050 was purchased directly from British Railways for preservation while the other four engines were rescued from Woodham Brothers scrapyard at Barry Island. To date 73096 has been the only member of the class to operate on the main line hauling railtours but in 2018 no. 73082 was moved by rail from its home at the Bluebell Railway to the West Somerset Railway.

Number & Name	Tender Attached	Builder	Built	Withdrawn	Service life	Location	Livery	Status	Image
73050 "City of Peterborough"	BR1G	Derby Works	April 1954	June 1968	14 Years, 2 months	Nene Valley Railway	BR Lined Black, Early Emblem	Boiler ticket expired in 2015, Under Overhaul	
73082 "Camelot"	BR1B	Derby Works	July 1955	June 1966	10 years, 11 months	Bluebell Railway	BR Lined Black, Early Emblem	Operational until 2031	
73096	BR1G	Derby Works	Nov 1955	Nov 1967	12 years	Mid Hants Railway	BR Lined Green, Late Crest	Purchased by and transferred to the Watercress Line, at which it was formerly a resident under private ownership, in November 2017. Boiler certificate expired in September 2011 awaiting overhaul	
73129	BR1B	Derby Works	Aug 1956	Dec 1967	11 years, 4 months	Midland Railway - Butterley	BR Lined Black, Early Emblem	Static Display, Boiler ticket expired in 2016. One of only two engines left in Britain with Caprotti valve gear.	
73156	BR1B	Doncaster Works	Dec 1956	Nov 1967	10 Years, 11 months	Great Central Railway	BR Lined Black, Late Crest	Recently emerged from scrapyard condition and came into full traffic in May 2018. Only remaining member built at Doncaster Works.	
