= Three Holes Cross =

Medieval site in Cornwall

Coordinates: 50.529°N 4.807°W

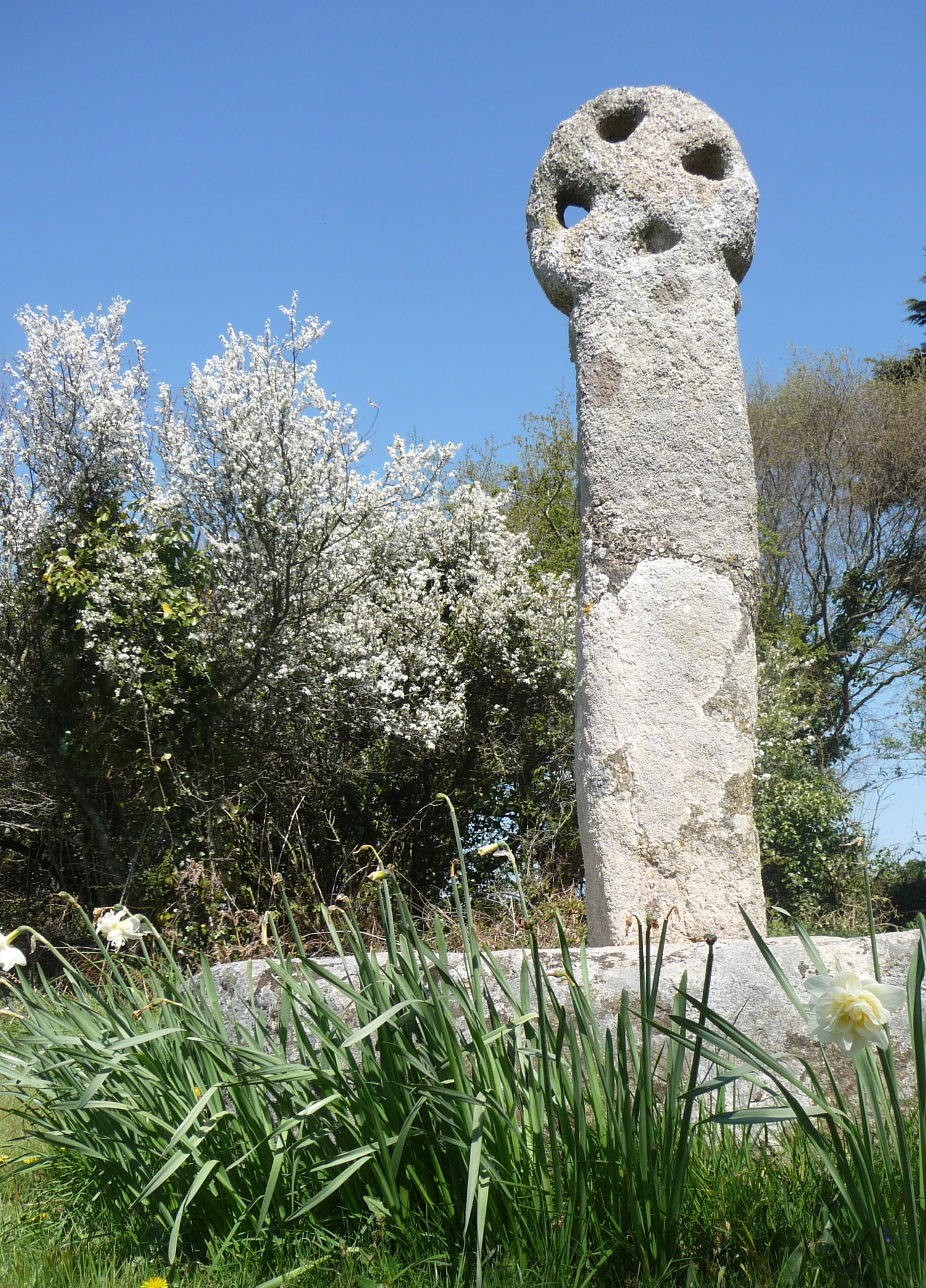
Three Holes Cross.

Three Holes Cross is a medieval wayside cross and junction on the A39 trunk road approximately 2 miles east of Wadebridge, Cornwall, United Kingdom at grid reference SX 01171 73668.

The cross is made of granite and stands 1.5 m high. The wheelhead includes four holes of which only three are fully cut through, giving the name of the cross and junction. The cross is a scheduled monument and Grade II listed building.

There is a settlement of a few houses nearby. The nearest house, a little way away from the cross was formerly the toll house to allow passage to Wadebridge.

An Iron Age fort known locally as Kelly Rounds (but mapped by the Ordnance Survey as Castle Killibury) is 300 metres west of Three Holes Cross.
