= Pen Rhionydd =

Supposed northern court of King Arthur

Pen Rhionydd is named as the location of King Arthur's northern court in a Welsh triad found in Peniarth MS 54, containing pre-Galfridian traditions:

Arthur as Chief Prince in Pen Rhionydd in the North, and Gerthmwl Wledig as Chief Elder, and Cyndeyrn Garthwys as Chief Bishop.

There are no other known references to this location in Arthurian literature. The same triad goes on to say Arthur's other courts were at Celliwig and Mynyw.

== Location ==
A possible location, supported by Rachel Bromwich, the latest editor of the Welsh Triads, is a location somewhere near the Rhins of Galloway and Stranraer. This would match the importance of St Mungo in that area. Both these places would have been in Rheged.

== See also ==
- Sites and places associated with Arthurian legend
- Historical basis for King Arthur
