= Kelly Rounds =

Iron Age hillfort in Cornwall, England

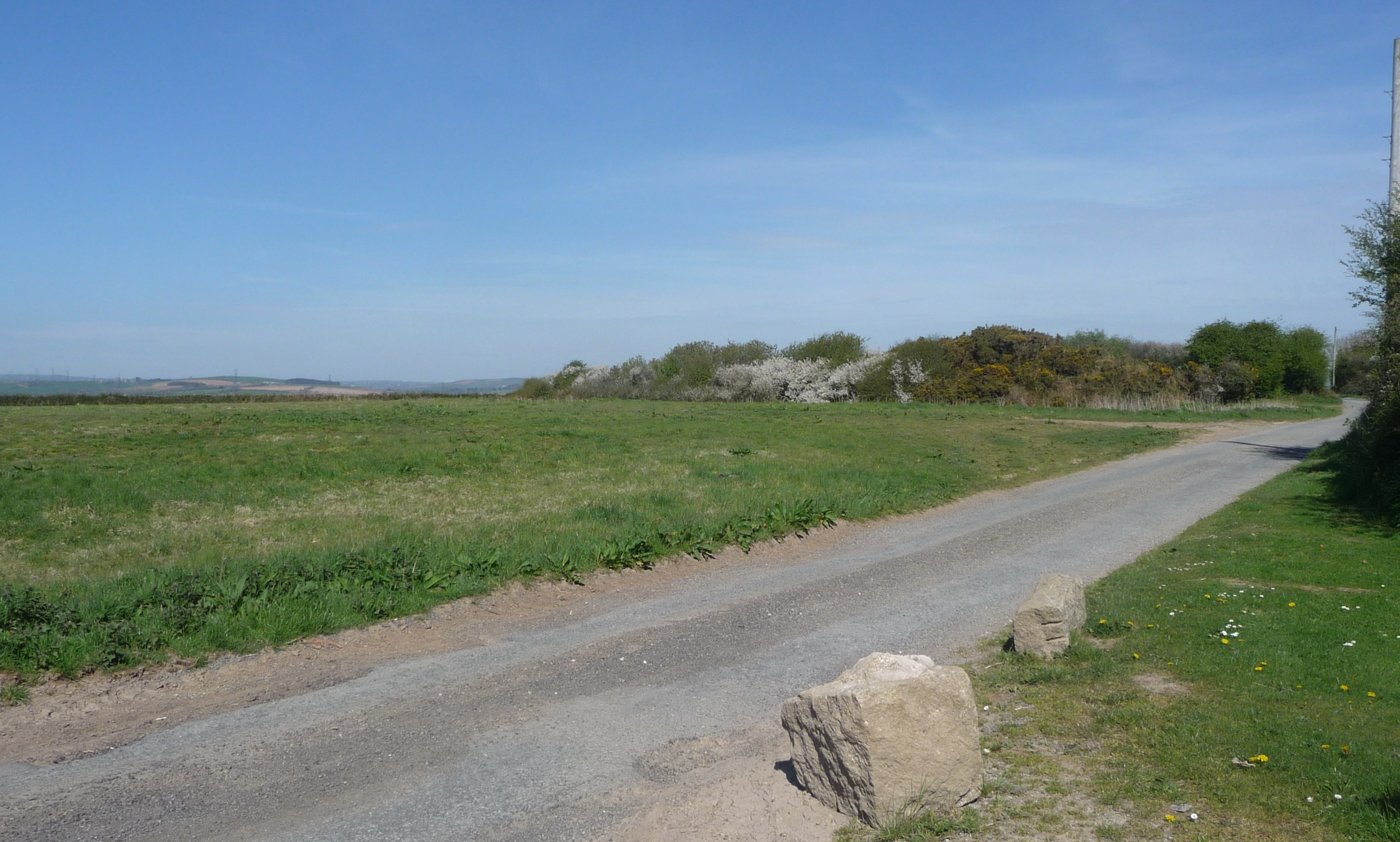
- Interactive map of Kelly Rounds
- 50.529°N 4.797°W
- Location: Wadebridge, Cornwall
- OS grid reference: SX0186373651

Scheduled monument
- Official name: Killibury Castle later Prehistoric hillfort
- Designated: 26 November 1928
- Reference no.: 1010439

Kelly Rounds, or Castle Killibury is an Iron Age hill fort in Cornwall, England, United Kingdom. It is situated beside the A39 trunk road approximately two miles east of Wadebridge.

The site is north of the village of St Mabyn, approximately 300 metres east of Three Holes Cross on the border of the parish of Egloshayle.

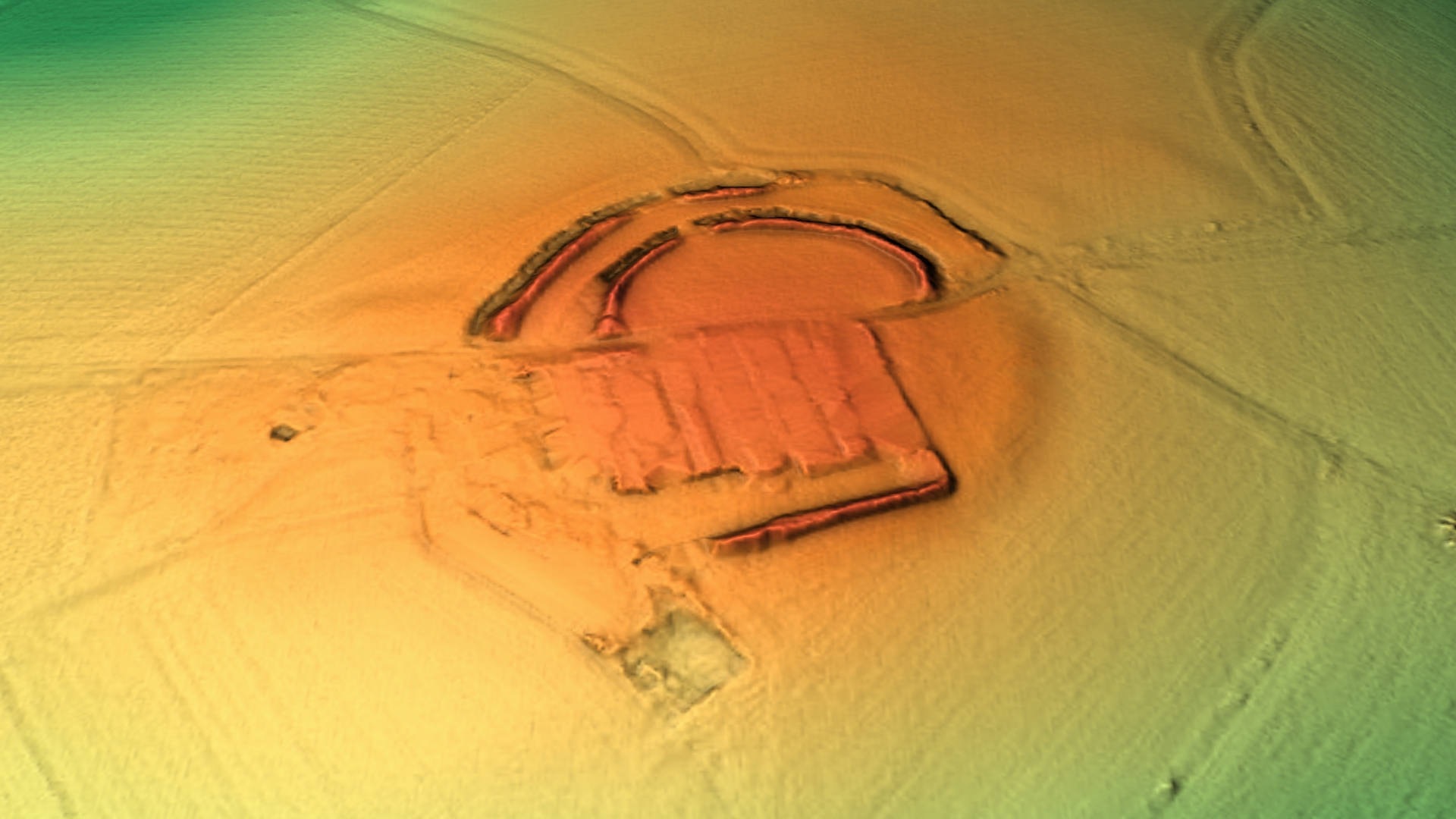
3D view of the digital terrain model

Radiocarbon dating has dated the occupation of Kelly Rounds to between 400 and 100 BC. More carbon dating has dated a pre-hill fort occupation as between 1250 and 950 BC.

== Description ==
The fort was described by Craig Weatherhill as "a bivallate Iron Age hill fort 230m in diameter. The ramparts, each about 3.0m high externally, are widely spaced and fronted by ditches (often flooded) 1.8m deep. The north side of the fort is well preserved, but to the south of the lane the defences have been ploughed almost flat. The northern half of a rectangular annexe survives on the west side of the fort, the rest was obliterated by the building of Sandylands Farm. On the opposite side of the fort cropmarks and traces of two contiguous annexes have been detected. Excavations found the inner ditch to have been cut 2.8m into the bedrock. It also showed that the earliest occupation of the site was during the 11th or 10th century BC. It is not known if this was before the defences were built. The fort has long been a leading candidate as the location of Arthur's home fort of Celliwig (along with Castle Canyke), but only two post-Roman sherds have been unearthed."

In July 2010 it was added to English Heritage's "heritage at risk register" because of ongoing deterioration.
