= Joyous Gard =

Castle from the legend of King Arthur

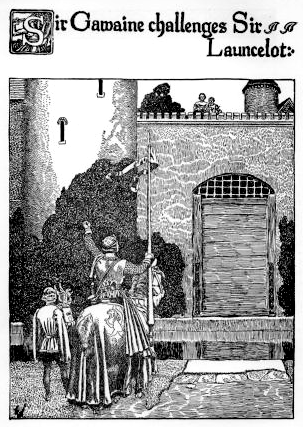
"Sir Gawaine challenges Sir Launcelot", Howard Pyle's illustration from The Story of the Grail and the Passing of King Arthur (1910)

Joyous Gard (French Joyeuse Garde and other variants) is a castle featured in the Matter of Britain literature of the legend of King Arthur. It was introduced in the 13th-century French Prose Lancelot as the home and formidable fortress of the hero Lancelot after his conquest of it from the forces of evil. Le Morte d'Arthur identified it with Bamburgh Castle.

== Legend ==
As told in the Vulgate Cycle's Lancelot en prose and the works based on it, the Joyous Gard is given its name by the young Lancelot (who had just discovered his own identity) when he sets up his household at the castle. He does it after single-handedly capturing it against all odds and ending its evil enchantment during the task to prove his knighthood to King Arthur (even rescuing Arthur's illegitimate son in the process). Up until then, it had been known as Dolorous Gard (French Douloureuse Garde and other variants), belonging to the Saxon-allied king Brandin of the Isles; the various motifs and perceived symbolism of the Dolorous Gard episode were subjects of several analyses by modern scholars. In the prose stories of Tristan and Iseult, the pair later lives in the castle with Lancelot's permission as refugees from King Mark of Cornwall.

Following Lancelot's adulterous and treasonous affair with Arthur's wife Queen Guinevere, Lancelot rescues Guinevere, who is under sentence of death from Arthur, and brings her to the Joyous Gard. In the Stanzaic Morte Arthur and elsewhere, Arthur and Gawain unsuccessfully besiege the castle. Eventually, Lancelot abandons his castle and goes to an exile in today's France. After his death, Lancelot's body is taken to the Joyous Gard for burial. In the French prose cycles, he is laid to rest next to the grave of his dear friend Galehaut (in the Post-Vulgate Queste del Saint Graal, their remnants are later dug up and destroyed by King Mark).

== Suggested locations ==
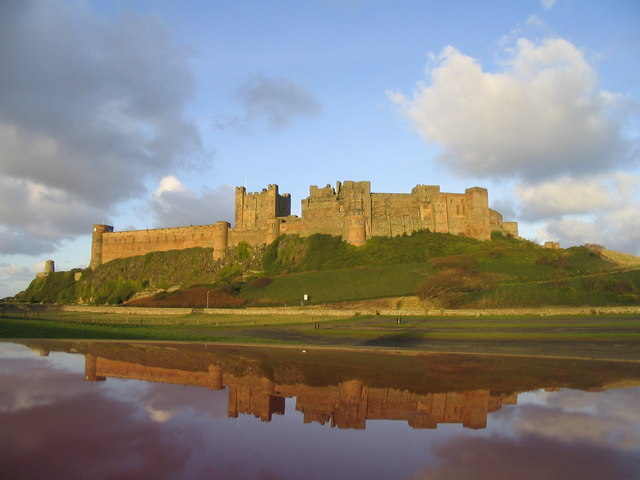
Bamburgh Castle in 2008

In his Le Morte d'Arthur, the late-medieval English writer Thomas Malory identified the Joyous Gard with Bamburgh Castle, a coastal castle in Northumberland that was built on former location of a Celtic Briton fort known as Din Guarie. Before writing his work, Malory personally participated in the Yorkist siege of the castle during the War of the Roses. He also proposed the nearby Alnwick Castle. Joyous Gard is further associated with the Château de Joyeuse Garde, an early medieval castle site in Brittany where the continental Arthurian tradition began.

== See also ==
- Castle of Gioiosa Guardia, a 13th-century Sardinian castle named after the legend
