= Llanvair Discoed =

Coordinates: 51.626783°N 2.798258°W

Llanvair Discoed: Welsh: Llanfair Disgoed
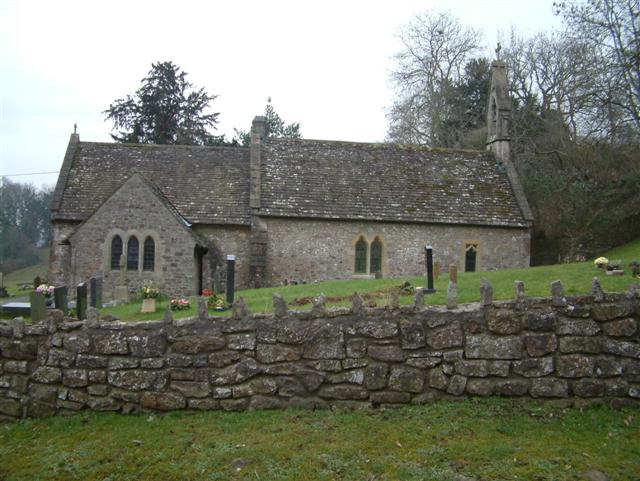
- St. Mary's Church, Llanfair Discoed

- Location within Monmouthshire
- OS grid reference: ST447923
- Principal area: Monmouthshire
- Preserved county: Gwent
- Country: Wales
- Sovereign state: United Kingdom
- Post town: CHEPSTOW
- Postcode district: NP16
- Dialling code: 01633
- Police: Gwent
- Fire: South Wales
- Ambulance: Welsh
- UK Parliament: Newport East

Llanvair Discoed (Welsh: Llanfair Disgoed) is a small village in Monmouthshire, south-east Wales, 6 miles west of Chepstow and 10 miles east of Newport.

== History ==
The village is mentioned in the Domesday Book of 1086 as 'Lamecare'. The name means Mary's (Mair > Fair) church (llan) under (is) the wood (coed). The 'd' at the start of Discoed only appears in more recent versions of the name. The correct Welsh language name is Llanfair Is Coed or Llanfair-iscoed. The wood refers to Wentwood, which at the time of the Kingdom of Gwent separated the cantref of Gwent Is Coed ("this side of the wood", as envisaged from Caerwent), from that of Gwent Uwch Coed ("beyond the wood").

The village contains a small ruined castle, believed to have been built by the FitzPayn family, as lords of Llanvair Discoed, in the 13th century.

=== Llanmelin hill fort ===
There is an Iron Age hill fort at Llanmelin, about one mile east of the village overlooking the Castrogi Brook and with distant views of the Severn estuary. The fort covers an area of 2.2 hectares (5.4 acres), with a small outpost enclosure to the north-east. It is believed to have been first built around the 4th century BC, and rebuilt and extended in the 1st century BC. Earthworks adjoining the fort to the south-east have been interpreted as funerary enclosures, suggesting to some that the fort was used as an oppidum or small town by the Silures. Finds of later Romano-British pottery have also been made at Llanmelin.

The site is one of a number which have been suggested as the true site of King Arthur's court at Celliwig or Camelot, following the Roman withdrawal from the nearby town of Venta Silurum or Caerwent. However, others have suggested that Llanmelin is not an especially impressive hillfort, and archaeological evidence so far is that it was primarily a defended enclosure for livestock with a few associated roundhouses.

=== Penhein ===
To the north lies Penhein, a "large, two storeyed villa of a standard Regency type." The house was designed for Samuel Brookes and took John Nash's villa at Cronkhill, Shropshire, as its inspiration. The villa is a Grade II listed building, and the gardens and park were listed on the Cadw/ICOMOS Register of Parks and Gardens of Special Historic Interest in Wales.

== Surroundings and amenities ==
The village is nestled at the bottom of Gray Hill, an important archaeological site with earthworks and standing stones dating from the Neolithic period up to the Bronze Age.

It is on the road between Caerwent and Usk via Wentwood. It currently has 67 houses, one pub (The Woodlands Tavern), and one parish church, namely St. Mary's Church in Wales church.

== Sources ==
- Newman, John (2000). Gwent/Monmouthshire. The Buildings of Wales. Penguin. ISBN 0-14-071053-1.
