= La Forest-Landerneau =

La Forest-Landerneau Ar Forest-Landerne
- Commune
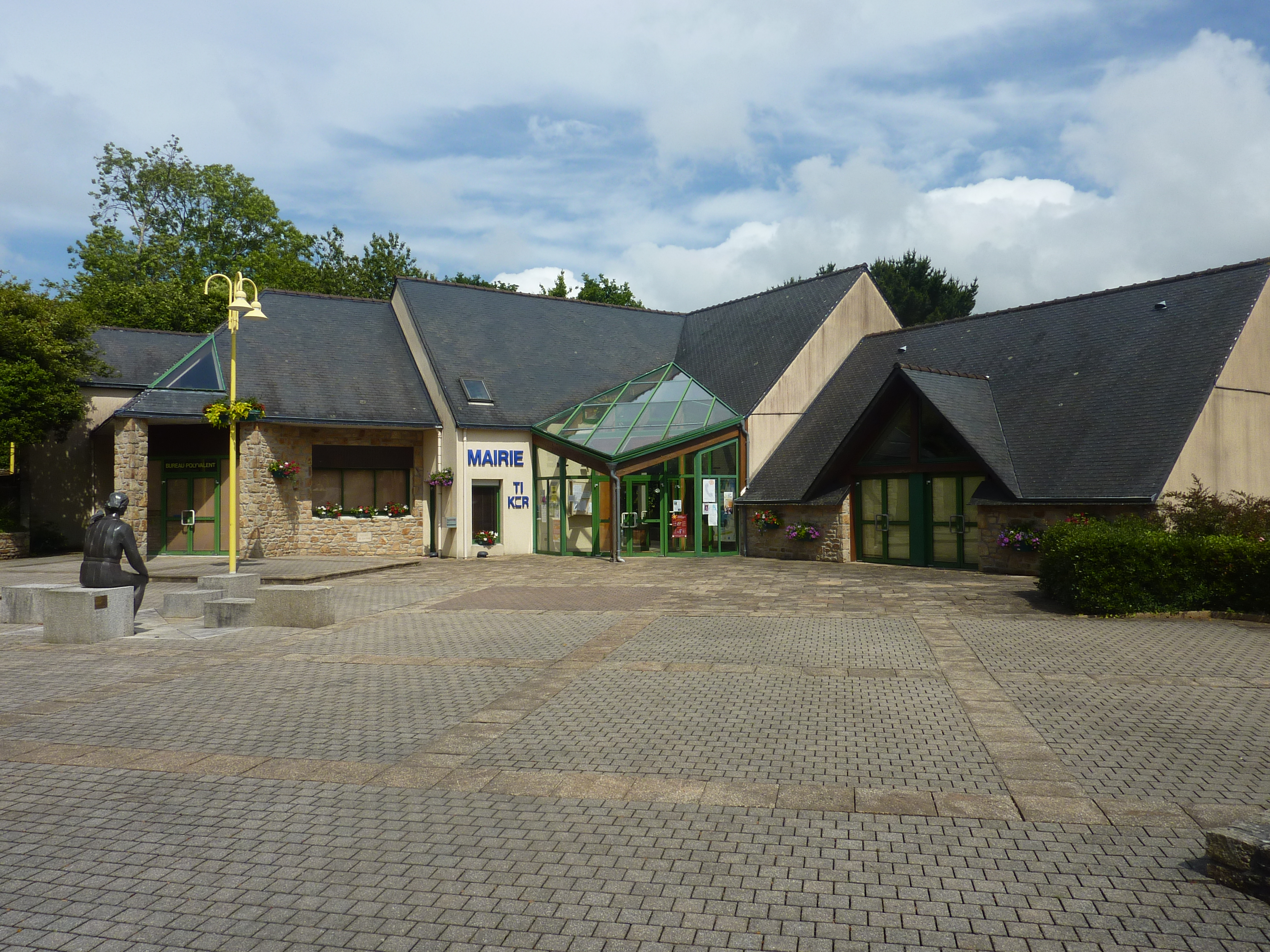
- The town hall in La Forest-Landerneau

- Flag Coat of arms
- Location of La Forest-Landerneau
- Location within France Location within Brittany
- Coordinates: 48°25′48″N 4°18′53″W
- Country: France
- Region: Brittany
- Department: Finistère
- Arrondissement: Brest
- Canton: Landerneau
- Intercommunality: CA Pays de Landerneau-Daoulas

Government
  - Mayor (2020–2026): David Roulleaux
- Area^{1}: 9.21 km^{2} (3.56 sq mi)
- Highest elevation: 111 m (364 ft)
- Lowest elevation: 0 m (0 ft)
- Population (2023): 2,018
  - Density: 219/km^{2} (567/sq mi)
- Time zone: UTC+01:00 (CET)
  - Summer (DST): UTC+02:00 (CEST)
- INSEE/Postal code: 29056 /29800
- ^{1} French Land Register data, which excludes lakes, ponds, glaciers > 1 km^{2} (0.386 sq mi or 247 acres) and river estuaries.

La Forest-Landerneau (French pronunciation: [la fɔʁε lɑ̃dεʁno]; Breton: Ar Forest-Landerne) is a commune in the Finistère department of Brittany in northwestern France.

== Population ==
Inhabitants of La Forest-Landerneau are called in French Forestois.

Historical population
Year	Pop.	±% p.a.
1968	930	—
1975	1,160	+3.21%
1982	1,384	+2.55%
1990	1,619	+1.98%
1999	1,595	−0.17%
2007	1,775	+1.35%
2012	1,818	+0.48%
2017	1,881	+0.68%
2023	2,018	+1.18%
Source: INSEE

== See also ==
- Communes of the Finistère department
- List of the works of Bastien and Henry Prigent
