= Caradog ap Bran =

Figure in Welsh mythology

Caradog ap Bran (sometimes spelled as Caradoc) is the son of the British king Bran the Blessed in Welsh mythology and literature, who appears most prominently in the second branch of the Mabinogi, the tale of Branwen ferch Llŷr. He is further mentioned in the Welsh Triads and in certain medieval Welsh genealogies. Caradog is the grandson of the sea god Llŷr, the nephew of Manawydan, Branwen, Efnisien and Nisien.

== Role in Welsh tradition ==
The Irish king Matholwch sails to Harlech to speak with Bran the Blessed, high king of the Island of the Mighty and to ask for the hand of his sister Branwen in marriage, thus forging an alliance between the two islands. Bendigeidfran agrees to Matholwch's request, but the celebrations are cut short when Efnisien, a half-brother to the children of Llŷr, brutally mutilates Matholwch's horses, angry that his permission was not sought in regards to the marriage. Matholwch is deeply offended until Bran offers him compensation in the form of a magic cauldron that can restore the dead to life. Pleased with the gift, Matholwch and Branwen sail back to Ireland to reign.

Once in Matholwch's kingdom, Branwen gives birth to a son, Gwern, but Efnysien's insult continues to rankle among the Irish and, eventually, Branwen is mistreated, banished to the kitchens as a servant and beaten every day. She tames a starling and sends it across the Irish Sea with a message to her brother Bendigeidfran, who raises a huge host in preparation for invasion. A council is held among the British and it is decided that seven men should stay behind to defend Britain; Bran's son Caradog is given seniority over the chieftains, namely Hefeydd the Tall, Unig Strong Shoulder, Iddig ab Anarawd, Ffodor ab Erfyll, Wlch Bone Lip, Llassar fab Llasar Llaes Gyngwyd and Pendaran Dyfed. Bran's host sails across the Irish Sea.

Upon Bran's departure, Caradog and his men are attacked by his uncle, Caswallawn fab Beli, who murders Caradog's men whilst concealed by a cloak of invisibility. Caradog, whom Caswallawn had not intended to kill, breaks his heart in despair at the deaths of his kinsmen, and Caswallawn ascends to the throne. Caradog's paternal uncle Manawydan learns of his nephew's death upon his return from Ireland and submits to the usurper. The triads allude to both Caradog's role as a defender of Britain and to his death; Triad 13 names him as one of the Chief Defenders of Britain, while Triad 95 refers to him as one of the three people who broke their hearts out of bewilderment.
