= Branwen ferch Llŷr =

Legendary tale in medieval Welsh literature

- "Branwen, daughter of Llŷr"
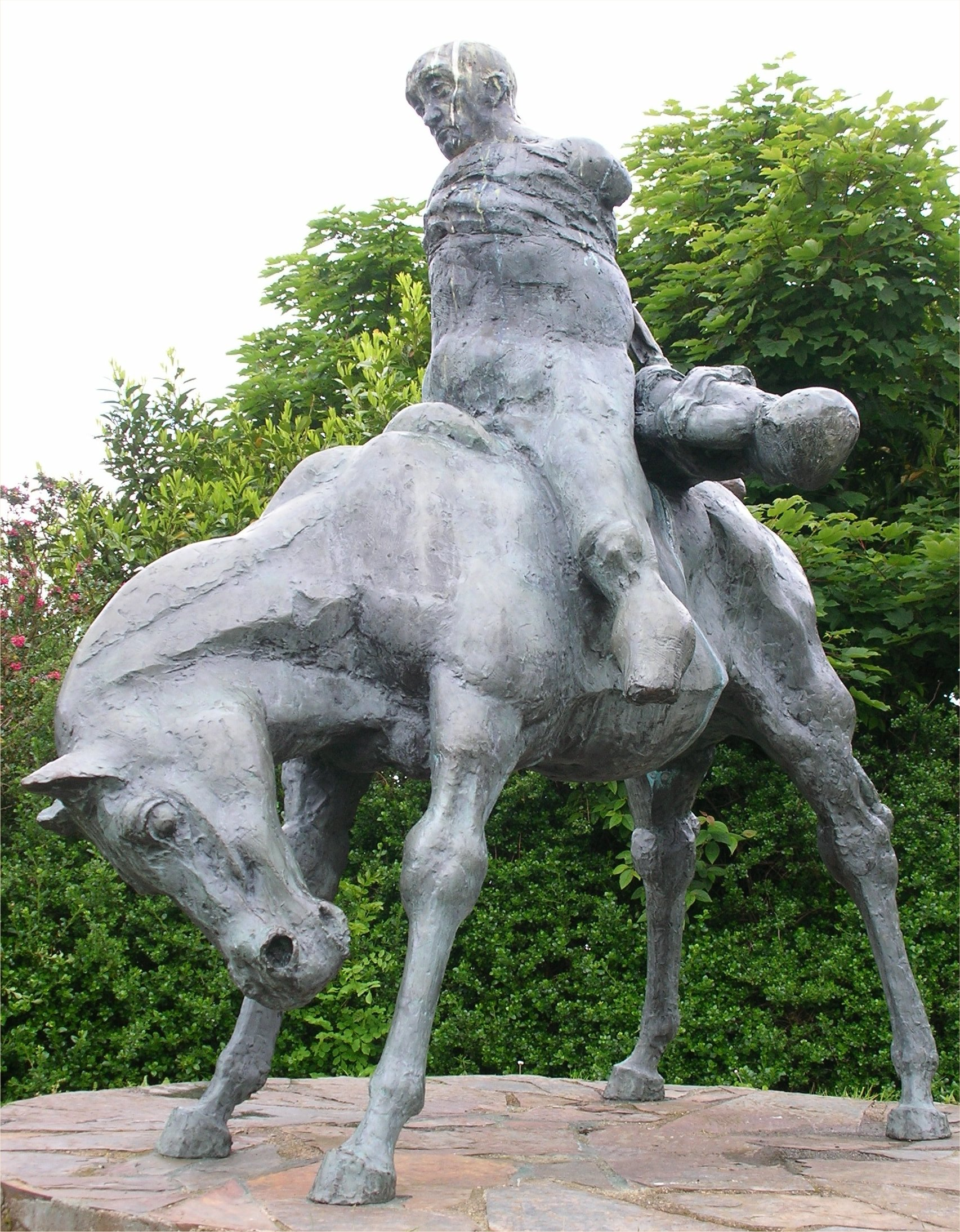
- The Two Kings (sculptor Ivor Robert-Jones, 1984) near Harlech Castle, Wales. Bendigeidfran carries the body of his nephew Gwern, following the latter's death at Efnysien's hands.
- Author(s): Unknown, generally believed to be a scribe from Dyfed.
- Language: Middle Welsh
- Date: Earliest manuscript dates to 14th century; tale believed to be much older.
- Series: Four Branches of the Mabinogi
- Genre: Welsh mythology
- Subject: Second branch of the Mabinogi. The assembly of Branwen and Matholwch and the Assembly of the Noble Head.
- Setting: Mostly Ireland, also Harlech, London and Aberffraw.
- Period covered: Mythological
- Personages: Bran the Blessed, Matholwch, Branwen, Efnysien, Manawydan, Pryderi, Taliesin, Gwern

Branwen ferch Llŷr; "Branwen, daughter of Llŷr" is a legendary tale from medieval Welsh literature and the second of the four branches of the Mabinogi. It concerns the children of Llŷr; Bendigeidfran (literally "Brân the Blessed"), high king of Britain, and his siblings Manawydan and Branwen, and deals with the latter's marriage to Matholwch, king of Ireland. Matholwch's mistreatment of the British princess leads to a mutually destructive war between the two islands, the deaths of most of the principal characters, and the ascension of Caswallon fab Beli to the British throne. Along with the other branches, the tale can be found in the medieval Red Book of Hergest and White Book of Rhydderch. It is followed directly by the third branch, Manawydan fab Llŷr.

It has been suggested that the tale derives in part from the third-century BC Gallic invasion of the Balkans, identifying Brân with the Gallic chieftain Brennus. Nikolai Tolstoy has suggested that the present version of the legend may have been influenced by the eleventh-century battles of Brian Boru and Máel Sechnaill, while Will Parker has proposed that the branch is distantly related to the Irish tales of Cath Maige Mucrama and Immram Brain as well as the early Arthurian texts The Spoils of Annwfn and How Culhwch won Olwen.

== Synopsis ==
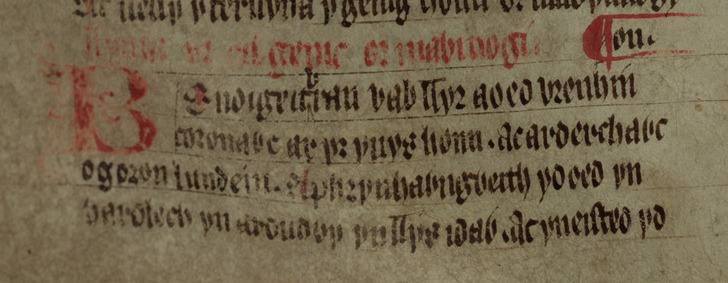
The opening lines of the Second Branch of the Mabinog: Bendigeidfran (Bran), son of Llyr, was the crowned king of this island. (Bodley/Jesus College, Oxford's manuscript)

The Irish king Matholwch sails to Harlech to speak with Bran the Blessed high king of the Island of the Mighty and to ask for the hand of his sister Branwen in marriage, thus forging an alliance between the two islands. Bendigeidfran agrees to Matholwch's request, but the celebrations are cut short when Efnisien, a half-brother to the children of Llŷr, brutally mutilates Matholwch's horses, angry that his permission was not sought in regards to the marriage. Matholwch is deeply offended until Bran offers him compensation in the form of a magic cauldron that can restore the dead to life. Pleased with the gift, Matholwch and Branwen sail back to Ireland to reign.

Once in Matholwch's kingdom, Branwen gives birth to a son, Gwern, but Efnisien's insult continues to rankle among the Irish and, eventually, Branwen is mistreated, banished to the kitchens and beaten every day. She tames a starling and sends it across the Irish Sea with a message to her brother Bendigeidfran, who sails from Wales to Ireland to rescue her with his brother, Manawydan, and a huge host of warriors, mustered from the 154 cantrefs of Britain. The Irish offer to make peace and build a house big enough to entertain Bendigeidfrân but hang a hundred bags inside, supposedly containing flour but actually containing armed warriors. Efnisien, suspecting a trick, reconnoitres the hall and kills the warriors by crushing their heads inside the bags. Later, at the feast, Efnisien, again feeling insulted, throws Gwern on the fire and a savage battle breaks out. Seeing that the Irish are using the cauldron to revive their dead, Efnisien hides among the corpses and destroys the cauldron, sacrificing himself in the process.

Only seven men survive the conflict, among them Manawydan, Taliesin and Pryderi fab Pwyll, prince of Dyfed, Branwen having herself died of a broken heart. The survivors are told by the mortally wounded Bran to cut off his head and to return it to Britain. For seven years the seven survivors stay in Harlech, where they are entertained by Bendigeidfran's head, which continues to speak. They later move on to Gwales (often identified with Grassholm Island off Dyfed) where they live for eighty years without perceiving the passing of time. Eventually, Heilyn fab Gwyn opens the door of the hall facing Cornwall and the sorrow of what had befallen them returns. As instructed they take the now silent head to Gwynfryn, the "White Hill" (thought to be the location where the Tower of London now stands), where they bury it facing France so as to ward off invasion.

Before the end of the tale, a small detour is taken to jab at the Irish. The battle in Ireland has only left five pregnant women, who give birth to five sons. These sons repopulate the island with the only women available on the island: the mothers. With that, the island is restored with human life, and five districts are created because of this incest. Though Ireland today is divided into four provinces, the five mothers and five sons helps to explain the structure of this island as well as poke fun at the Irish people. This story, after the digression, concludes with the retelling of the main points of Branwen's story.
