= Gwern =

Mythical character in Welsh tradition

Gwern (meaning "Alder") is a minor figure in Welsh tradition. He is the son of Matholwch, king of Ireland, and Branwen, sister to the king of Britain. He appears in the tale of Branwen, daughter of Llŷr, in which his murder at the hands of his sadistic uncle Efnysien sparks a mutually destructive battle between Britain and Ireland.

== Role in Welsh tradition ==
=== Background ===
Matholwch, King of Ireland, sails across the Irish Sea to ask the British High King, Brân, for the hand of his sister Branwen in marriage. Bendigeidfran agrees to this, but during a feast to celebrate the betrothal, Efnisien, a half-brother of Branwen and Bendigeidfran, arrives and asks what was going on. When told, he is furious that Branwen has been given in marriage without his permission, and retaliates by mutilating Matholwch's horses. Matholwch is deeply angered until Bendigeidfran gives him a magic cauldron which restores the dead to life.

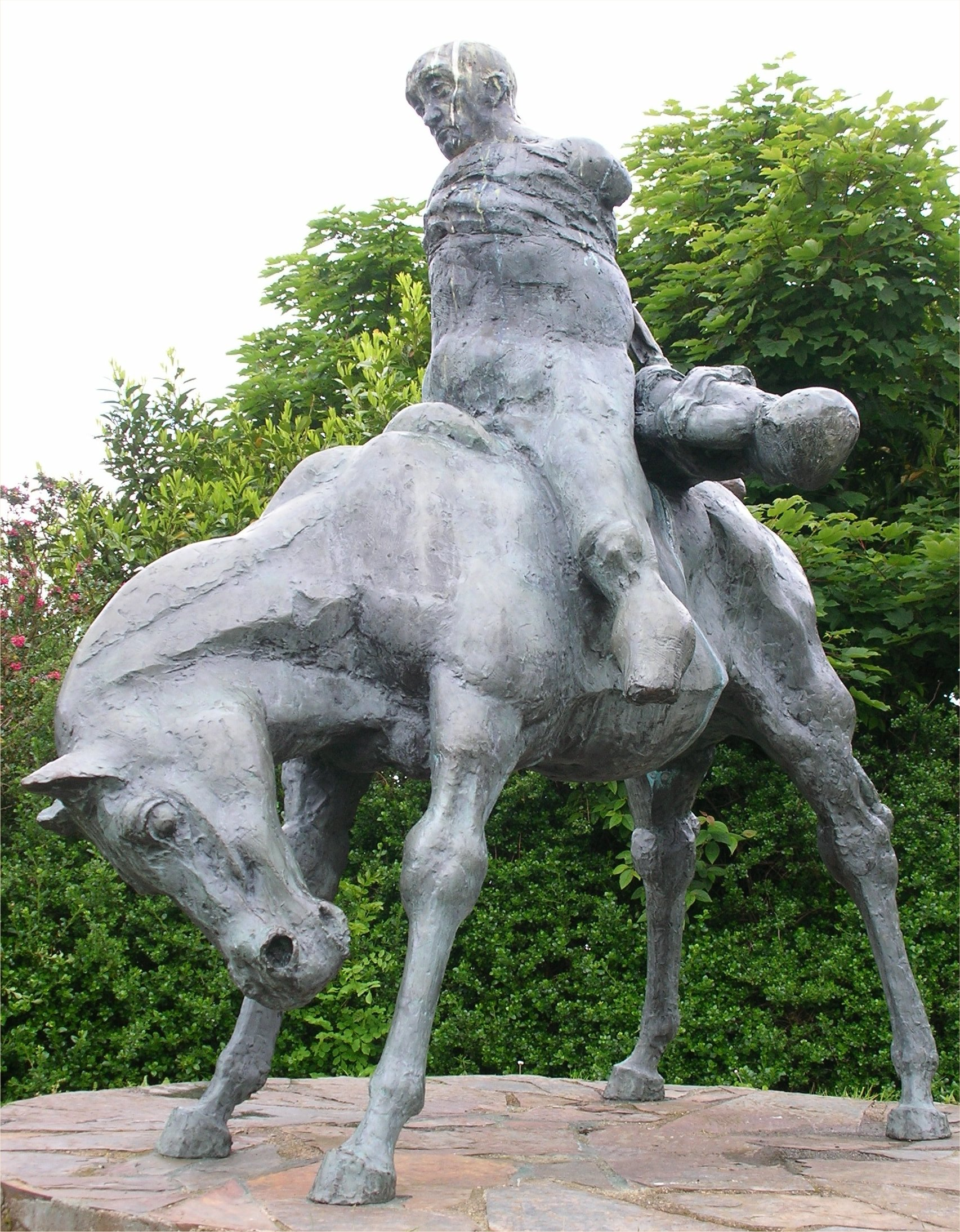
The Two Kings (sculptor Ivor Robert-Jones, 1984) near Harlech Castle, Wales. Bendigeidfran carries the body of his nephew Gwern, following the latter's death at Efnysien's hands.

Once in Ireland, Branwen is treated cruelly by her husband, Matholwch, and is forced to work in the kitchen. She tames a starling and sends it across the Irish Sea with a message to her brother Bendigeidfran, who sails from Wales to Ireland to rescue her with his brother, Manawydan and a host raised from the one hundred and fifty four cantrefs of Britain. The Irish offer to make peace by building a house big enough to entertain Bendigeidfrân but hang a hundred bags inside, supposedly containing flour but actually containing armed warriors. Efnisien, suspecting treachery, reconnoitres the hall and kills the warriors by crushing their skulls.

=== Death ===
To make peace between the kingdoms, Branwen and Matholwch's young son, Gwern, ascends to the throne of Ireland and, during the feast held in the Great House in his honour, is called in turn to his uncles Bran, Manawydan and Nisien. He is then called to Efnysien who, seemingly without motive, throws the boy into the flames, burning him to death. Branwen attempts to rescue her son from the fire but is held back by Bendigeidfran.

=== Aftermath ===
As a result of Efnysien's "unspeakable crime", the two hosts rise up against each other and a vicious fighting begins. In the ensuing battle, the Irish at first have the advantage because of the magic cauldron. When the Irish dead are placed in it, they came to life and were able to fight as well as ever, though they cannot speak. Efnisien lies down among the dead and is placed in the cauldron, then breaks it, bursting his heart and dying in the process. The Welsh eventually win the war, but only seven men survived. Bendigeidfran himself is dying from a mortal wound in the foot, and orders that his head should be cut off and buried in London. When the survivors return to Britain, Branwen dies of grief from believing that she was the cause of the war; she is buried beside the River Alaw in Anglesey.

For seven years the seven survivors, amongst them Manawydan and Pryderi, stay in Harlech, where they are entertained by Bendigeidfran's head, which continues to speak. They later move on to Gwales (often identified with Grassholm Island off Dyfed) where they live for eighty years without perceiving the passing of time. Eventually, one of the men opens the door of the hall facing Cornwall and the sorrow of what had befallen them returns. As instructed they take the now silent head to the Gwynfryn, the "White Hill" (thought to be the location where the Tower of London now stands), where they bury it facing France so as to ward off invasion. The imagery of the talking head is widely considered to derive from the ancient Celtic "cult of the head"; the head was considered the home of the soul.

=== The Battle of the Trees ===
A number of texts relate to Cad Goddeu or, The Battle of the Trees, a conflict between Arawn, king of the otherworld, and the children of Dôn, Amaethon, Gwydion and his nephew Lleu. The battle was fought on account of the "white roebuck and the whelp" stolen by Amaethon from the Otherworld.

A great warrior fights alongside Arawn and cannot be overcome unless his name can be guessed by the opposing force. Gwydion, the Venedotian magician sings these englyns, identifying the warrior as Bran:

Sure-hoofed is my steed impelled by the spur;
The high sprigs of alder are on thy shield;
Bran art thou called, of the glittering branches."

Sure-hoofed is my steed in the day of battle:
The high sprigs of alder are on thy hand:
Bran by the branch thou bearest
Has Amathaon the good prevailed."

Bran is here identified by the "sprigs of alder" (gwern) on his shield. A number of scholars have suggested an association between Gwern's role in Branwen and in the bardic tradition relating to the Battle of the Trees.
