= Euroswydd =

Euroswydd is a figure in Welsh mythology, the father of Nisien and Efnysien by Penarddun, daughter of Beli Mawr. In the Second Branch of the Mabinogi Penarddun is married to Llŷr, by whom her children are Brân, Branwen, and Manawydan. The circumstances of Nisien and Efnysien's conception are not described, but one of the Welsh Triads mentions that Euroswydd had held Llŷr captive as one of the Three Exalted Prisoners of the Island of Britain; it is likely the traditions are connected.

It is possible he is the aging King in the Manx tale Y Chadee and father of Eshyn and Ny-Eshyn oddly familiar sounding names of a Good son (Eshyn) and a Bad son (Ny-Eshyn) which parallel what is said about Nisien and Efnisien in the tale of Branwen ferch Llyr, whom the later are considered only uterine brothers of Bran Fendigaid ab Llyr. Whilst the Manx tale never names the aging King properly except as King of Ellan Vannin (the Isle of Man).

== Etymology ==
Euroswydd means '(the one of the) gilded seat', as per Welsh euro, meaning 'to gild', and swydd, meaning 'seat, position, office'.
