= Efnysien =

Anti-hero in Welsh mythology

Efnisien fab Euroswydd (also spelled Efnissien or Efnysien) is a sadistic anti-hero in Welsh mythology, appearing prominently in the tale of Branwen ferch Llŷr, the second branch of the Mabinogi. Described by Will Parker as "a study in the psychopathic personality" and an "embodiment of the forces of anti-social disruption," he is the catalyst of the tale's ultimate tragedy, and is largely responsible for the destruction of both Ireland and the Island of the Mighty. He is the son of Euroswydd and Penarddun, twin brother to Nisien, and half-brother to Brân the Blessed, Manawydan, and Branwen. The Welsh Triads call Llŷr one of the Three Exalted Prisoners of Britain for his captivity at Euroswydd's hands; this is likely to a lost tradition of the birth of Penarddun's younger sons.

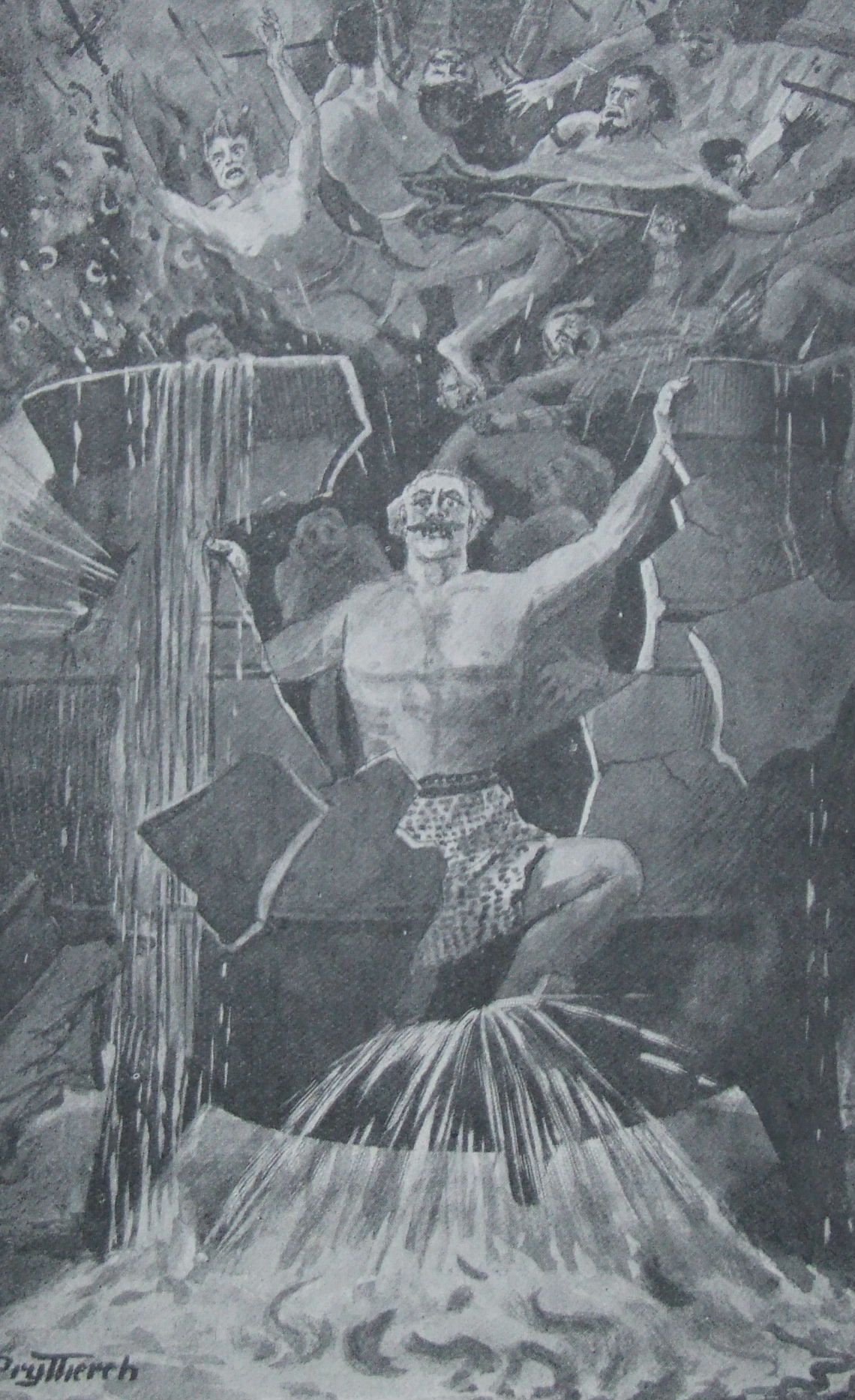
Efnisien's self-sacrifice (image by T. Prytherch)

== Role in Welsh tradition ==
The Irish king Matholwch sails to Harlech to speak with Brân the Blessed high king of the Island of the Mighty and to ask for the hand of his sister Branwen in marriage, thus forging an alliance between the two lands. Bendigeidfran agrees to Matholwch's request, but the celebrations are cut short when Efnysien, a half-brother to the children of Llŷr, brutally mutilates Matholwch's horses, angry that his permission was not sought in regards to the marriage. Matholwch is deeply offended until Bran offers him compensation in the form of a magic cauldron that can restore the dead to life. Pleased with the gift, Matholwch and Branwen sail back to Ireland to reign.

Once in Matholwch's kingdom, Branwen gives birth to a son, Gwern, but Efnysien's insult continues to rankle among the Irish and, eventually, Branwen is mistreated, banished to the kitchen and beaten every day. She tames a starling and sends it across the Irish Sea with a message to her brother Bran, who sails from Wales to Ireland to rescue her with his brother, Manawydan and a huge host of warriors, mustered from the 154 cantrefs of Britain. The Irish offer to make peace and build a house big enough to entertain Bendigeidfrân but hang a hundred bags inside, supposedly containing flour but actually containing armed warriors. Efnisien, suspecting treachery, reconnoitres the hall and kills the warriors by crushing their skulls. Later, at the feast, Efnysien, again feeling insulted, murders Gwern by burning him alive, and, as a result, a vicious battle breaks out. Seeing that the Irish are using the cauldron to revive their dead, he hides among the Irish corpses and is thrown into the cauldron by the unwitting enemy. He destroys the cauldron from within, sacrificing himself in the process.

Only seven men survive the conflict, among them Manawydan, Taliesin and Pryderi, prince of the Kingdom of Dyfed, Branwen having herself died of a broken heart. The survivors are told by a mortally wounded Bran to cut off his head and to return it to Britain. For seven years the seven survivors stay in Harlech, where they are entertained by Bendigeidfran's head, which continues to speak. They later move on to Gwales (often identified with Grassholm off Dyfed) where they live for eighty years without perceiving the passing of time. Eventually, Heilyn fab Gwyn opens the door of the hall facing Cornwall and the sorrow of what had befallen them returns. As instructed they take the now silent head to the Gwynfryn, the "White Hill" (thought to be the location where the Tower of London now stands), where they bury it facing France so as to ward off invasion.

== Character analysis ==
Described variously by modern scholars as "warped", "perverted", "malicious", and "psychopathic", Efnysien is often considered to be one of the most vivid and interesting characters to appear in the four branches. Referring to Efnysien's atrocities throughout the tale, Will Parker writes:

The rage here is calculated, as is the horrific orgy of violence that follows. His actions are deliberately staged to inflict the most profound damage to the weak points of the social fabric around him - in this case relations with the men of Ireland. While he is in some ways an embodiment of the forces of anti-social disruption the author is targeting throughout the Mabinogi - there is also the hint complex inner life, which finds a poignant expression in his final demise.

Jeffrey Gantz describes him as, "[T]he controlling force of Branwen,...a story all by himself: progressively insecure and envious, cruel and sadistic, clever and resourceful, repentant and self-sacrificing."

The character has been compared to other trickster figures, such as the Irish hero Bricriu Nemthenga and the Norse god Loki. Nikolai Tolstoy describes Efnisien as "the gallant if peevish Briton who selflessly sacrifices himself for his comrades", while he is characterised by Proinsias Mac Cana as a force of "irrational malice and hate".

== In modern media ==
- Efnisien appeared prominently in the 2003 film Otherworld, in which he was voiced by Welsh actor Alun Raglan.
- In 2006, Welsh singer-songwriter Elin Fflur released an EP entitled Ysbryd Efnisien (Efnisien's Ghost).
- Evnyssien is the title of a song by Italian band Ataraxia.
- 'A Hero's Death' on Friends and Enemies; Lovers and Strangers by singer-songwriter Sharron Kraus tells the story of Efnisien.
