= Brabeți =

Brabeți may refer to several villages in Romania:

- Brabeți, a village in Bârla Commune, Argeș County
- Brabeți, a village in Daneți Commune, Dolj County
