= Aber Alaw =

River mouth of Afon Alaw, in Wales

Coordinates: 53°18′08″N 4°33′00″W

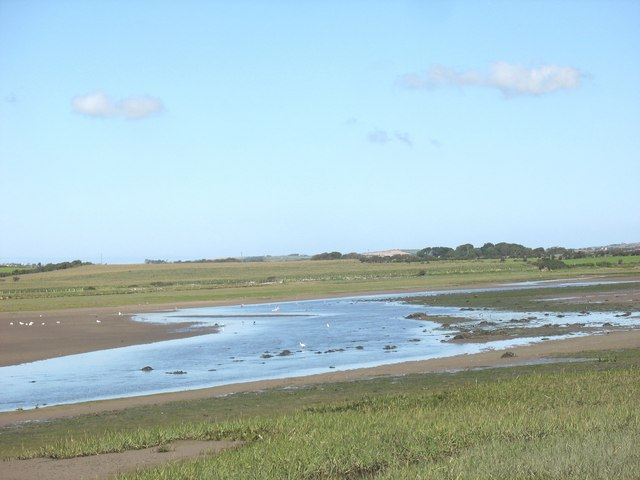
View north across the estuary of Afon Alaw

Aber Alaw (Welsh: "Mouth of the Alaw" ) is at the mouth of the Afon Alaw on Anglesey, in North Wales. It is located just north of Valley and south west of Llanfachraeth.

According to the Mabinogion, it is here that Queen Branwen died of grief after escaping the destruction of Ireland. She and the seven survivors of Prydein (Britain) landed at Talebolyon, and upon seeing the coasts of both Ireland and Prydein, she died of a broken heart, blaming herself for the havoc.

At Llanddeusant, Anglesey on the banks of the Alaw can be found the cairn called Bedd Branwen, her supposed grave. Now in ruins, it still has one standing stone. It was dug up in 1800, and again in the 1960s by Frances Lynch, who found several urns with human ashes.
