= Penarddun =

Figure in Welsh mythology

Penarddun is a figure in Welsh mythology, the wife of Llŷr. The Second Branch of the Mabinogi names Bran, Branwen, and Manawydan as her children by Llŷr, and ascribes to her two additional sons by Euroswydd: Nisien, a good man, and Efnysien, a conniving troublemaker. The Welsh Triads call Llŷr one of the Three Exalted Prisoners of Britain for his captivity at Euroswydd's hands; this likely refers to a lost tradition of the birth of Penarddun's younger sons. The Mabinogi names Penarddun as a daughter of the ancestor Beli Mawr, but the genealogy is confused; it is possible she was meant to be his sister rather than daughter.

The name Penarddun can be translated as "Chief Beauty" or "Most Fair" (Welsh pen "head, chief, foremost" + arddun "fair, beautiful (of a girl)".
