= Bran (disambiguation) =

Bran is the hard outer layer of cereal grains.

Bran may also refer to:

== Places ==
- Bran, Brașov, a commune in Brașov County, Romania
  - Bran Castle, a medieval German castle in Romania, wrongly associated with Vlad Țepeş ("Dracula")
- Bran, a village in Golăiești Commune, Iași County, Romania
- Bran, Charente-Maritime, a commune in the Charente-Maritime département in France
- Bran (Oroso), a place in the parish of Os Ánxeles in the Galician council of Oroso, Spain
- Castell Dinas Brân, a castle in Llangollen, Wales

== People ==
- Bran Mutimirović, Serbian prince
- Bran Drobnjak, founder of the Drobnjaci clan
- Bran Ardchenn, king of Leinster
- Bran Becc mac Murchado, king of Leinster
- Bran Ferren, American designer and inventor
- Guto Nyth Brân, legendary Welsh athlete

== Characters ==
- Brân the Blessed, a character in Welsh mythology
- Bran Mak Morn, the last King of the Picts in Robert E. Howard's fiction
- Bran mac Febail, the protagonist of Immram Brain (The Voyage of Bran), a tale from Irish mythology
- Bran Stark, a character from A Song of Ice and Fire by George R. R. Martin

== Other ==
- Broadband Radio Access Network (BRAN), a European Telecommunications Standards Institute project involving low-cost, high-capacity radio links
- A nickname (abbreviation) for "Brandon"
- Accademia della Crusca, also known as "The Bran"; crusca is Italian for bran
- Bran (exoplanet) (HAT-P-36b), a hot Jupiter-type exoplanet orbiting Tuiren (HAT-P-36)
- National Agrarian Reform Agency (Indonesian: Badan Reforma Agraria Nasional, BRAN), a government agency of Indonesia

== See also ==
- List of Celtic deities: Brân, Celtic for “Raven”, Celtic god
- Slavic names, see Bron, Bran: to protect, to defend
- Related Romanian place-names
  - Brănești (disambiguation)
  - Braniște (disambiguation)
  - Braniștea (disambiguation)
- Branle, Baroque dance (Spanish form)
