= Braniște =

Braniște is a Romanian word of Slavic origin with the general meaning of "something protected", such as a royal property, a forest, etc. It is mainly found nowadays in place-names and may refer to:

- Braniște, a village in Daneți Commune, Dolj County, Romania
- Braniște, a village in Filiași Town, Dolj County, Romania
- Braniște, a village in Podari Commune, Dolj County, Romania
- Braniște, Rîșcani, a commune in Rîșcani district, Moldova

== See also ==
- Bran (disambiguation)
- Brănești (disambiguation)
- Braniștea (disambiguation)
