= Brân the Blessed =

Giant, king, and god in Welsh mythology (18-70)

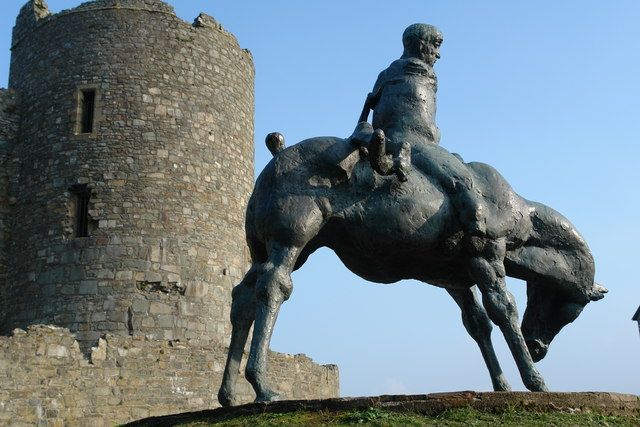
- The Two Kings (sculptor Ivor Robert-Jones, 1984) at Harlech Castle, Wales. Bendigeidfran carries the body of his nephew Gwern following the latter's death at Efnysien's hands.
- Other names: Brân Fendigaidd; Bendigeidfran; Bendigeit Vran; Brân Llyr
- Dynasty: Llŷr
- Gender: Male
- Region: Wales

Genealogy
- Parents: Llŷr; Penarddun

Brân the Blessed (Welsh: Bendigeidfran or Brân Fendigaidd, literally "Blessed Crow") is a giant and king of Britain in Welsh mythology. He appears in several of the Welsh Triads, but his most significant role is in the Second Branch of the Mabinogi, Branwen ferch Llŷr. He is a son of Llŷr and Penarddun, and the brother of Brânwen, Manawydan, Nisien and Efnysien. The name "Brân" in Welsh is usually translated as crow or raven. He is considered a sea-god as well as a god of poetry and bards.

== Role in the Mabinogion ==
The Irish king Matholwch sails to Harlech to speak with Brân the Blessed, high king of the Island of the Mighty and to ask for the hand of his sister Branwen in marriage, thus forging an alliance between the two islands. Brân agrees to Matholwch's request, but the celebrations are cut short when Efnysien, a half-brother of Brân and Branwen, brutally mutilates Matholwch's horses, angry that his permission was not sought in regard to the marriage. Matholwch is deeply offended until Brân offers him compensation in the form of a magic cauldron that can restore the dead to life. Pleased with the gift, Matholwch and Branwen sail back to Ireland to reign.

Once in Matholwch's kingdom, Branwen gives birth to a son, Gwern, but Efnysien's insult continues to rankle among the Irish, and eventually Branwen is mistreated, banished to the kitchen and beaten every day. She tames a starling and sends it across the Irish Sea with a message to her brother Brân. Brân wades across the Irish Sea to rescue her with his brother Manawydan and a huge host of warriors, mustered from the 154 cantrefi of Britain, following in ships. The Irish offer to make peace, and build a house big enough to entertain Brân, but they hang a hundred bags inside, supposedly containing flour but actually containing armed warriors. Efnysien, suspecting treachery, reconnoitres the hall and kills the warriors by crushing their skulls. Later, at the feast, Efnysien, again feeling insulted, murders Gwern by burning him alive, and a vicious battle breaks out. Seeing that the Irish are using the cauldron to revive their dead, he hides among the Irish corpses and is thrown into the cauldron by the unwitting enemy. He destroys the cauldron from within, sacrificing himself in the process.

Only seven men survive the conflict, among them Manawydan, Taliesin and Pryderi fab Pwyll, prince of Dyfed, Branwen having herself died of a broken heart. The survivors are told by a mortally wounded Brân to cut off his head and to return it to Britain. For seven years the seven survivors stay in Harlech, where they are entertained by Brân's head, which continues to speak. They later move on to Gwales (often identified with Grassholm Island off Dyfed) where they live for eighty years without perceiving the passing of time. Eventually, Heilyn fab Gwyn opens the door of the hall facing Cornwall and the sorrow of what had befallen them returns. As instructed, they take the now silent head to the Gwynfryn, the "White Hill" (thought to be the location where the Tower of London now stands), where they bury it facing France so as to ward off invasion. The imagery of the talking head is widely considered to derive from the ancient Celtic "cult of the head"; the head was considered the home of the soul.

== Role in Branwen ferch Llŷr ==
King Bran was sitting on the rocky shore at Harlech when he saw thirteen ships over the horizon coming from Southern Ireland. Soon the boat men came to shore declaring the fleet belonged to the Irish Lord Matholwch who came seeking Bran's sister Branwen's hand in marriage. Of course to Bran this union made sense, someone worthy of his sister had come forth and their union would bring forth a powerful alliance for the two kingdoms. Bran readily welcomed King Matholwch of Ireland ashore and gave him great hospitality. The wedding was decidedly set at the coast to Aberffraw. All this had to be set inside specially erected tents since no house had yet been built that could accommodate the giant King Bran. Soon after all the wedding and celebration took place Bran's half brother Efnysien returned to Wales and was puzzled to see so many foreign horses stabled. He asked whom the horses belonged and was enraged to find his sister had been given away without his consent. In his anger he maimed all the Irish horses by cutting their lips back to their gums, their ears down to their skulls, eyelids to eyeballs, and their tails to their rumps. Matholwch's courtiers advised him to see this as a calculated insult from the Welsh and was in the end persuaded to head back home in dudgeon. Bran sent his best messengers to attempt to sway Matholwch. He sent with them a stick of solid silver as tall as himself and as thick as a finger along with a plate made of gold the circumference of his face. He also offered to replace every horse maimed and begged Matholwch to see his family dilemma, Bran could not execute his own brother. He begged to meet with the Irish King face to face so that he might make a humble apology. The two kings met again, however during the meeting Matholwch expressed his feeling that Bran's compensation was too small. Bran could not stand for that, so he offered Matholwch a magic black cauldron that could bring the dead back to life on the condition they could not speak. Matholwch was astounded by this great gift and forgot all unpleasantries that had come before. The next morning the fleet of thirteen ships left for Ireland with Branwen and Matholwch side by side.

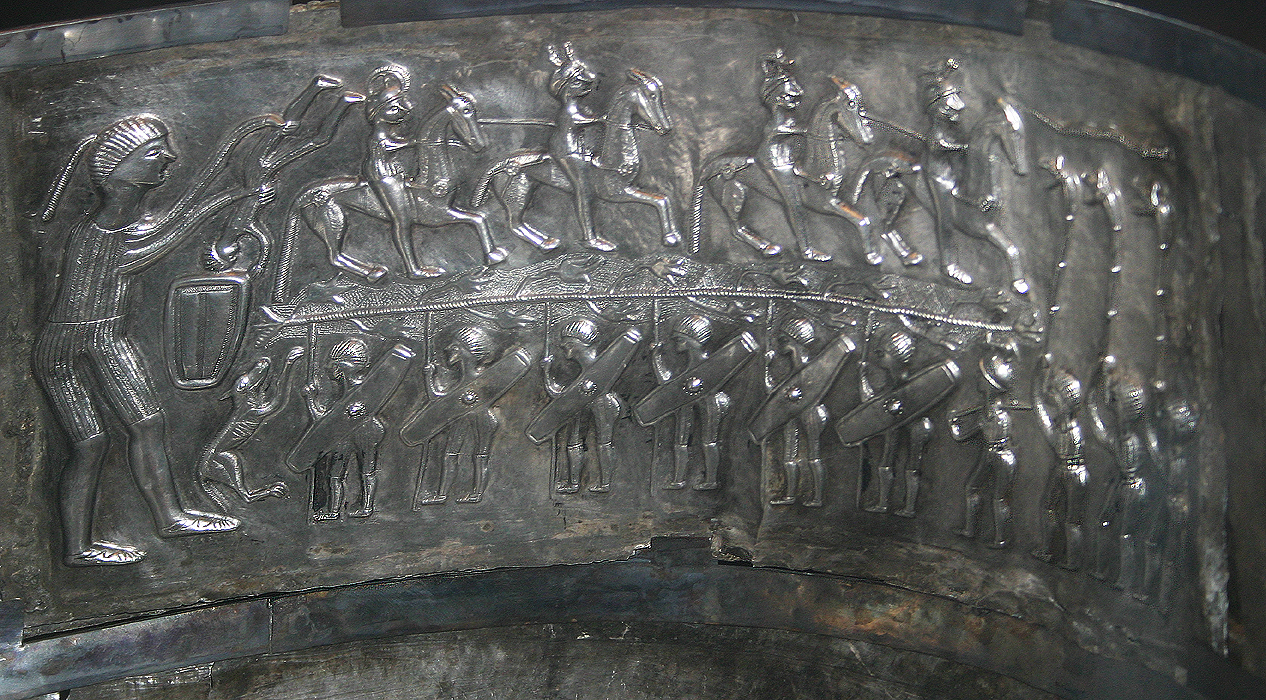
The Gundestrup Cauldron

At first sight the Irish loved their new queen, and they brought many gifts to the castle celebrating Matholwch and Branwen's union and in due time Branwen bore a son Gwern and the realm once again rejoiced. A few years passed and the counselors began to reflect once again on the maiming of the horses. They believed that Matholwch had not acted like a man and probed him to take out this injustice on his wife Branwen. The council made him expel her from his court and forced her to work in the kitchen. In the kitchen she faced being bullied by the cook and stared at by the kitchen boys who even boxed her ears. This mistreatment continued on for three years, in that time Branwen had been taming a starling to help take her mind off things. One day she fastened a letter to the starling meant for her brother Bran pleading for help. The bird made its way to Wales and dove from the sky during one of Bran's legislative assemblies. What Bran read inside made him feel despair then fury. He declared war on the Irish to exact revenge for his beloved sister.

Bran led all his armies down the shore to Ireland. From the shore Matholwch's swineherds saw an awesome sight, an entire landscape it seemed moving towards Ireland. They soon saw Bran wading through the water ahead of the fleet since no ship could carry him. The Irish ran across the river Shannon and barred the way from the sea so that no ships could travel up the river. Just before Bran's troops landed they saw that the Irish had destroyed the bridge and blocked the river. At that moment Bran said “The man who would lead his people must first become a bridge” then he positioned himself across the flow so that his troops could march across. Matholwch's men seeing the Welsh advance successfully, said they would atone for the injustice done to Branwen by ensuring the kingship of Bran's nephew Gwern. That alone did not satisfy Bran, so they offered to build him a house that would accommodate his massive body. Bran only accepted after Branwen's plea, for she feared bloodshed. The house the Irish built however was a clever trick as they hid one hundred soldiers inside bags throughout the home instructed to jump out at the feast and kill the nearest Welshman. They did not however factor in Efnysien, who arrived at the house to inspect it, obviously expecting foul play. He went around and crushed the skull of every man hidden inside a bag. Soon after the great feast took place and Gwern went around charming his new-found relatives from Wales. Efnysien complained the boy had not greeted him, and then suddenly grabbed the boy by his heels and cast him head first into the huge fire. Branwen in a craze tried to leap into the fire, Bran stopped her knowing she would die too. He then protected his sister from the fight that broke out escorting her outside the house. The Welsh had the advantage until the Irish brought out their secret weapon, the black cauldron that could reanimate the dead. Efnysien seeing the great trouble he brought his country men he decided upon one last act of valour.

He hid himself in the bodies of the fallen Irish. When the cauldron attendants came along and threw him in, he spread his body out in all directions, shattering the cauldron but sacrificing himself in the process. During the great fight Bran took a fatal blow to the foot, and as he lay in his deathbed he gave his men these last instructions: “Cut my head off and take it to London. Eventually you must bury it in the state on the White Hill of London (thought to be the location where the Tower of London now stands), turning my head towards France.” Ceremonially they cut off Bran's head and left Ireland. When they returned to Wales and Branwen had time to contemplate all that had happened, she died there on the spot of a broken heart. The men buried her where she fell and continued on their quest for London.

== Other associations ==
Brân is said to have owned a magical horn of plenty that could produce unlimited food and drink.

According to the Welsh Triads, Brân's head was buried in London where the White Tower now stands. As long as it remained there, Britain would be safe from invasion. However, King Arthur dug up the head, declaring the country would be protected only by his great strength. There have been attempts in modern times to link the still-current practice of keeping ravens at the Tower of London under the care of Yeomen Warder Ravenmaster with this story of Brân. The connection can still be seen in several Celtic languages, in Welsh brân means crow, and bran means raven in both Cornish and Irish.

Several scholars have noted similarities between Brân the Blessed and the Arthurian character the Fisher King, the keeper of the Holy Grail. The Fisher King first appears in Chrétien de Troyes's 12th century French romance Perceval, the Story of the Grail; he has been dealt a mortal wound in the leg (Brân's wound was in his foot) but stays alive in his mystical castle due to the effects of the Grail, waiting to be healed by Percival. A later author who took up the story, Robert de Boron, describes the history of the Grail in ancient times, and says the first Fisher King was a man called "Bron". Additionally, the Welsh story Peredur son of Efrawg, a version of the Percival story with several striking deviations, features the hero visiting a mysterious castle, although he does not find the Grail there, but rather a severed human head. Additionally, some works attribute to the Grail the power to restore the fallen, making it somewhat similar to Brân's cauldron. Others have identified Bendigeidfran with the Irish hero Bran mac Febal.

John T. Koch proposes a number of parallels between the mythological Bendigeidfran and the historical Celtic chieftain Brennus, who invaded the Balkans in the 3rd century BC. He goes on to suggest an association between Brân and Brancaster, a fort on the Norfolk coast, while Rachel Bromwich suggests that Castell Dinas Brân in Denbighshire is similarly related. Count Nikolai Tolstoy proposes that Brân's original function was that of a psychopomp, guiding the souls of the dead to the Otherworld.

Brân is praised in the poetry of 12th century bard Cynddelw Brydydd Mawr, in which he is described as "a good commander of the host; in battle, in hostile territory, in the contest, in stress", while, in his elegy for Llywelyn ap Gruffudd, Prince of Wales, Bleddyn Fardd compares the overthrow of the prince to the deaths of Llywelyn Fawr, King Arthur and Brân. A poem found in the Black Book of Carmarthen refers to Bendigeidfran's death in Ireland, claiming that Gwyn ap Nudd was present at the battle, either as a warrior or in his traditional role as a psychopomp.

The novel series The Chronicles of Prydain by Lloyd Alexander, whose second installment is named The Black Cauldron, is based on Welsh mythology. The Disney film The Black Cauldron, based loosely on the novel series, features a cauldron that can bring the dead back to life.

The novel series A Song of Ice and Fire by George R. R. Martin includes several characters named Brandon (Bran) Stark. Many of them have epithets commonly associated with their names, such as Brandon the Builder, Brandon the Breaker, Brandon the Shipwright, Brandon the Burner, Brandon the Bad, and Brandon the Daughterless. The television series Game of Thrones is based on the Martin novels. One of the Brandon Starks is associated with crows in the novels, and with ravens in the TV series.

== Name ==
The Welsh mythological texts of the Mabinogion were recorded between the 14th and 15th centuries in Middle Welsh. As a result, there are discrepancies regarding the spelling of names, because English translations maintain Middle Welsh orthography whereas Modern Welsh versions use Modern Welsh orthography. In Middle Welsh, there was some variation on the name Brân. In modern Welsh, the treiglad meddal (soft mutation) is Frân, but in Middle Welsh documents, this might be rendered as Vran or Uran (the latter arising because U and V represented the same letter in Latin).

In the Mabinogion, the character is referred to virtually exclusively as "Bendigeituran"; that is, with the epithet "Bendigeit" (blessed or praiseworthy) attached (a terminal D is pronounced similarly to T in Welsh, and in early documents was also spelt with T). The only exceptions are in the patronymic of his son Caradog ap Brân and a single reference to his gathering in Ireland as Gwledd Brân, "The feast of Brân (or 'Crow')". This usage is followed in the Welsh Triads. Bendigeituran becomes "Bendigeidfrân" or "Brân Fendigeid" in Modern Welsh; Bendigeidfran is the form used in many Modern Welsh adaptations of the Mabinogion. However, earlier references generally do not include the epithet, instead calling the character Brân fab Llŷr or simply Brân. Ifor Williams thought Bendigeit was a late addition, perhaps a replacement for a word that had become obsolete by the time the Mabinogi was recorded. "Vran" appears in an old poem in the Book of Taliesin, while Cynddelw Brydydd Mawr and Prydydd y Moch mention Brân fab Llŷr several times in their poetry, under different spellings. However, Bleddyn Fardd refers to "Benigeitran" in his elegy for Llywelyn ap Gruffudd, demonstrating that the epithet "Bendigeit" had been attached to Brân since the late 13th century.

In West Penwith, Cornwall, the name Bran is associated with Caer Bran a Cornish Round and the Men Scryfa which records a Brittonic Rialobrani Cunovali Fili ('royal raven' son of 'Famous Leader') suggesting a local leader carried the name of the famous hero, the son of Cynfawl.
