= Brănești =

Brănești may refer to several places:

- Brănești, Dâmbovița, a commune in Dâmbovița County, Romania
- Brănești, Gorj, a commune in Gorj County, Romania
- Brănești, Ilfov, a commune in Ilfov County, Romania
- Brănești, a village in Vlădești, Galați, Romania
- Brănești, a district in Făget town, Timiș County, Romania
- Brănești, Orhei, a village in Ivancea commune, Orhei raion, Moldova

== See also ==
- Bran (disambiguation)
- Braniște (disambiguation)
- Braniștea (disambiguation)
- Brăneasa River
