= Braniștea =

Braniştea is a Romanian place-name of Slavic origin with the general meaning of "the protected place", such as a royal property, a forest, etc. It may refer to:

- Braniștea, Bistrița-Năsăud, a commune in Bistrița-Năsăud County
- Braniștea, Dâmbovița, a commune in Dâmbovița County
- Braniștea, Galați, a commune in Galați County
- Braniștea, Mehedinți, a commune in Mehedinți County
- Braniştea, a village in Uda, Argeș
- Braniştea, a village in Nicorești Commune, Galați County
- Braniştea, a village in Oinacu Commune, Giurgiu County
- Braniştea, a village in Fundu Moldovei Commune, Suceava County

== See also ==
- Bran (disambiguation)
- Brănești (disambiguation)
- Braniște (disambiguation)
