= Welsh mythology =

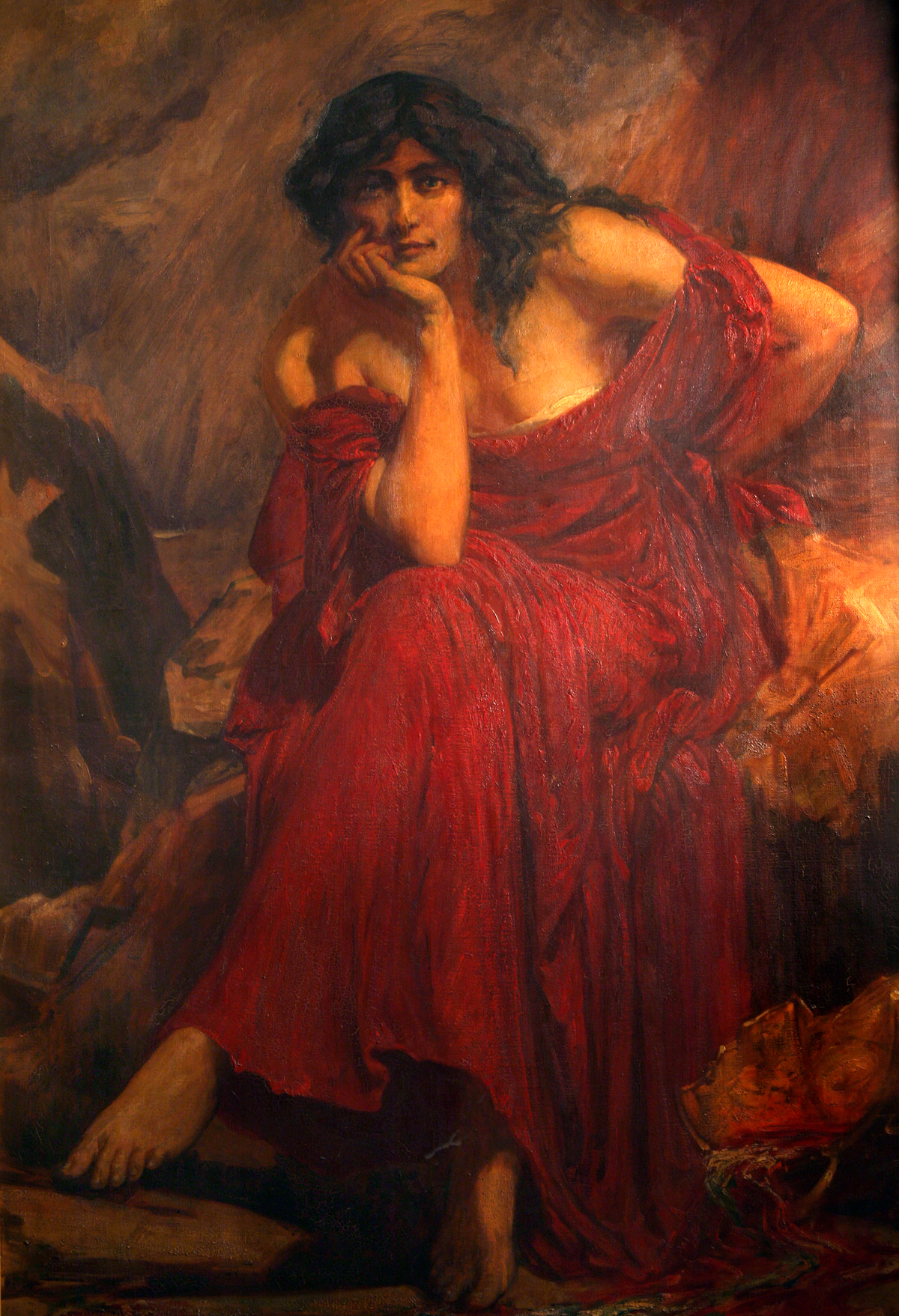
A leading figure in Welsh mythology, Ceridwen featuring in works by medieval bards, Victorian writers and modern artists. She is regarded as the goddess of rebirth, transformation, and inspiration by modern pagans.

Welsh mythology, also known as Y Chwedlau (Welsh for 'the legends'), consists of both folk traditions developed in Wales, and traditions developed by the Celtic Britons elsewhere before the end of the first millennium. As in most predominantly oral societies, Celtic mythology and history were recorded orally by specialists such as druids (Welsh: derwyddon). This oral record has been lost or altered as a result of outside contact and invasion over the years. Much of this altered mythology and history is preserved in mediaeval Welsh manuscripts, which include the Red Book of Hergest, the White Book of Rhydderch, the Book of Aneirin and the Book of Taliesin. Other works connected to Welsh mythology include the ninth-century Latin historical compilation Historia Brittonum ('History of the Britons') and Geoffrey of Monmouth's 12th-century Latin chronicle Historia Regum Britanniae ('History of the Kings of Britain'), as well as later Welsh folklore, such as the materials collected in The Welsh Fairy Book by William Jenkyn Thomas (1908).

== Cosmogony and creation ==
As with other Insular Celts, no direct written accounts of the origins of the cosmos survive. It can be assumed that these Celts did have a complex cosmogony, given the accounts from classical authors about the depth of knowledge of the druids who passed down their knowledge via orature.

However, scholars can find connections to the broader Proto-Indo-European system in both the names of the deities themselves and in the later written tales that likely preserve remnants of the earlier orally transmitted narratives. Legends were not written down until after the Christianization of Britain, however, so these accounts are rather indirect; additionally, they likely evolved substantially over time anyway, as narrative systems typically do.

John T. Koch proposes that the name of the goddess Dôn, for instance, likely comes from *ghdhonos, meaning "the earth." In this sense she serves as the Welsh version of the *dheghom figure from Proto-Indo-European mythology, i.e. the primordial Earth Goddess from which all other gods originate. According to this theory, the Children of Dôn would be comparable to the Greek Titans.

John Carey suggests that the Fourth Branch of The Mabinogi, along with the Taliesin poems (especially Cad Goddeu), contain hints of the cyclicality of cosmogonic progressions.

Claude Sterckx proposes that Celtic mythology hints at a cyclical cosmogony given a key commonly repeated story pattern: a man (hero/king) and woman (earth or sovereignty goddess) face a rival for the woman's affection before uniting to birth a son who represents the life of the world; ultimately these figures die to create space for the cycle to repeat. For instance, the names of certain Welsh mythological figures point to this pattern, as John Koch suggests that Gwron ("divine husband") and Modron ("divine mother") united to create Mabon ("divine son"). This pattern occurs in The Mabinogion as well, with Pwyll and Rhiannon facing the rival Gwawl before uniting to conceive Pryderi. In both Mabon and Pryderi's cases, the divine son is taken by force soon after birth, with the divine parent(s) needing to wait years before ultimately reuniting with the son.

With this in mind, the transformations of various characters (especially Lleu and Taliesin) hint not just at reincarnation but perhaps even reconfigurations of the cosmos itself (along the lines of the Norse concept of Ragnarok as not merely signaling the end of existence, but heralding the beginning of a subsequent existence for the cosmos).

=== Realms of existence ===
1) Elfydd: The Earth; the realm of humans

2) Annwn: The Otherworld; the realm(s) of the gods. Depending on the source, this could be a more typical Indo-European underworld (i.e. a realm below the earth) where souls wait to be reincarnated, or the "deep" areas within the natural realm (e.g. deep within the woods, as with the First Branch of The Mabinogi, or within/near lakes, e.g. the Arthurian Lady of the Lake, Ceridwen in Hanes Taliesin, etc.). Rather than being separate from nature, the Celts likely saw the Otherworld as being a mysterious but essential aspect of nature and a parallel to Elfydd.

While the sky and its celestial bodies are clearly separate from the earth, there does not seem to be an association between gods and the sky in extant Welsh myth (though there likely would have been at some earlier point; "cf. yn Annwfyn is eluydd, yn awyr uch eluydd ‘in the Un-world below elfydd, in the air above elfydd,’" from The Book of Taliesin.

Sharon Paice Macleod proposes that the ancient Celts had a concept of the World Tree that links the various realms of the world (akin to the Norse Yggdrasil), given the centrality of trees in Celtic knowledge, but there is no clear evidence for this.

== Legends ==
Unlike the section above, we find the following legends in actual literary texts instead of etymological and mythical reconstructions by academic scholars.

=== The Four Branches of the Mabinogi ===
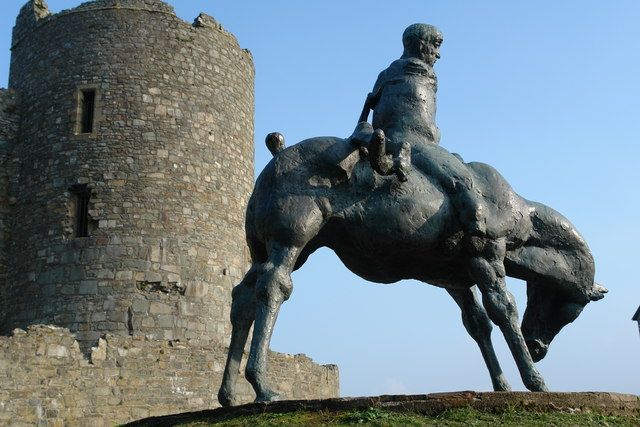
The Two Kings (sculptor Ivor Roberts-Jones, 1984) near Harlech Castle, Wales. Brân the Blessed carries the body of his nephew Gwern.

Four of the mythological stories contained in the Mabinogion are collectively known as the Four Branches of the Mabinogi. They concentrate largely on the exploits of various British deities who have been Christianized into kings and heroes. The only character who appears in every branch is Pryderi fab Pwyll, the king of Dyfed, who is born in the first Branch, is killed in the fourth, and is probably a reflex of the Celtic god Maponos. The only other recurring characters are Pryderi's mother Rhiannon, associated with the peaceful British prince Manawydan, who later becomes her second husband. Manawydan and his siblings Brân the Blessed (Welsh: Bendigeidfran or Brân Fendigaidd "Blessed Crow"), Branwen and Efnysien are the key players of the second branch, while the fourth branch concerns itself with the exploits of the family of Dôn, which includes the wizard Gwydion, his nephew, Lleu Llaw Gyffes, and his sister, Arianrhod.

==== Pwyll, Prince of Dyfed ====
The first branch tells of how Pwyll, prince of Dyfed, exchanges places for a year with Arawn, the ruler of Annwn (the "otherworld"), defeats Arawn's enemy Hafgan, and on his return encounters Rhiannon, a beautiful maiden whose horse cannot be caught up with. He manages to win her hand at the expense of Gwawl, to whom she is betrothed, and she bears him a son, but the child disappears soon after his birth. Rhiannon is accused of killing him and forced to carry guests on her back as punishment. The child has been taken by a monster, and is rescued by Teyrnon and his wife, who bring him up as their own, calling him Gwri of the Golden hair, until his resemblance to Pwyll becomes apparent. They return him to his real parents, Rhiannon is released from her punishment, and the boy is renamed Pryderi.

==== Branwen ferch Llŷr ====
In the second branch Branwen, sister of Brân the Blessed, king of Britain, is given in marriage to Matholwch, king of Ireland. Branwen's half-brother Efnysien insults Matholwch by mutilating his horses, and in compensation Brân gives Matholwch new horses and treasure, including a magical cauldron that can restore the dead to life. Matholwch and Branwen have a son, Gwern, but Matholwch proceeds to mistreat Branwen, beating her and making her a drudge. Branwen trains a starling to take a message to Brân, who goes to war against Matholwch. His army crosses the Irish Sea in ships, but Brân is so huge that he wades across. The Irish offer to make peace, and build a house big enough to entertain Bran, but inside they hang a hundred bags, telling Efnysien they contain flour, when in fact they conceal armed warriors. Efnysien kills the warriors by squeezing the bags. Later, at the feast, Efnysien throws Gwern on the fire and fighting breaks out. Seeing that the Irish are using the cauldron to revive their dead, Efnysien hides among the corpses and destroys the cauldron, although the effort costs him his life. Only seven men, all Britons, survive the battle, including Pryderi, Manawydan and Bran, who is mortally wounded by a poisoned spear. Brân asks his companions to cut off his head and take it back to Britain. Branwen dies of grief on returning home. Five pregnant women survive to repopulate Ireland.

==== Manawydan fab Llŷr ====
Pryderi and Manawydan return to Dyfed, where Pryderi marries Cigfa and Manawydan marries Rhiannon. However, a mist descends on the land, leaving it empty and desolate. The four support themselves by hunting at first, then move to England, where they make a living by making, successively, saddles, shields and shoes. Each time their products are of such quality that local craftsmen cannot compete, and drive them from town to town. Eventually they return to Dyfed and become hunters again. A white boar leads them to a mysterious castle. Against Manawydan's advice, Pryderi goes inside, but does not return. Rhiannon goes to investigate and finds him clinging to a bowl, unable to speak. The same fate befalls her, and the castle disappears. Manawydan and Cigfa return to England as shoemakers, but once again the locals drive them out and they return to Dyfed. They sow three fields of wheat, but the first field is destroyed before it can be harvested. The next night the second field is destroyed. Manawydan keeps watch over the third field, and when he sees it destroyed by mice he catches their leader and decides to hang it. A scholar, a priest and a bishop in turn offer him gifts if he will spare the mouse, but he refuses. When asked what he wants in return for the mouse's life, he demands the release of Pryderi and Rhiannon, and the lifting of the enchantment over Dyfed. The bishop agrees, because the mouse is in fact his wife. He has been waging magical war against Dyfed because he is a friend of Gwawl, whom Pwyll, Pryderi's father, humiliated.

==== Math fab Mathonwy ====
While Pryderi rules Dyfed, in the south of Wales, Gwynedd in the north of Wales is ruled by Math, son of Mathonwy. His feet must be held by a virgin except while he is at war. Math's nephew, Gilfaethwy, is in love with Goewin, his current footholder, and Gilfaethwy's brother Gwydion tricks Math into going to war against Pryderi so Gilfaethwy can have access to her. Gwydion kills Pryderi in single combat, and Gilfaethwy rapes Goewin. Math marries Goewin to save her from disgrace, and banishes Gwydion and Gilfaethwy, transforming them into a breeding pair of deer, then pigs, then wolves. After three years they are restored to human form and return.

Math needs a new footholder, and Gwydion suggests his sister, Arianrhod, but when Math magically tests her virginity she gives birth to two sons. One, Dylan, immediately takes to the sea. The other child is raised by Gwydion, but Arianrhod tells him he will never have a name or arms unless she gives them to him, and refuses to do so. Gwydion tricks her into naming him Lleu Llaw Gyffes ("Bright, of deft hand"), and giving him arms. She then tells him he will never have a wife of any race living on Earth, so Gwydion and Math make him a wife from flowers, called Blodeuwedd (possibly "Flower face", though other etymologies have been suggested). Blodeuwedd falls in love with a hunter, Gronw Pebr, and they plot to kill Lleu. Blodeuwedd tricks Lleu into revealing the means by which he can be killed, but when Gronw attempts to do the deed Lleu escapes, transformed into an eagle. Gwydion finds Lleu and transforms him back into human form, and turns Blodeuwedd into an owl, renaming her Blodeuwedd and cursing her. Gronw offers to compensate Lleu, but Lleu insists on returning the blow that was struck against him. Gronw pleads to be allowed to hide behind a rock when he attempts to kill him. Lleu agrees. He kills Gronw with his spear, which is thrown so hard it pierces him through the stone he is hiding behind.

===== Cad Goddeu =====
A large tradition seems to have once surrounded the Battle of the Trees, a mythological conflict fought between the sons of Dôn and the forces of Annwn, the Welsh Otherworld, and seemingly connected to the Fourth Branch of the Mabinogi. Amaethon, one of the sons of Dôn, steals a white roebuck and a whelp from Arawn, king of the otherworld, leading to a great battle.

Gwydion fights alongside his brother and, assisted by Lleu, enchants the "elementary trees and sedges" to rise up as warriors against Arawn's forces. The alder leads the attack, while the aspen falls in battle, and heaven and earth tremble before the oak, a "valiant door keeper against the enemy". The bluebells combine and cause a "consternation" but the hero is the holly, tinted with green.

A warrior fighting alongside Arawn cannot be vanquished unless his enemies can guess his name. Gwydion guesses the warrior's name, identifying him from the sprigs of alder on his shield, and sings two englyns:

"Sure-hoofed is my steed impelled by the spur;
The high sprigs of alder are on thy shield

=== Native tales ===
==== The Dream of Macsen Wledig ====
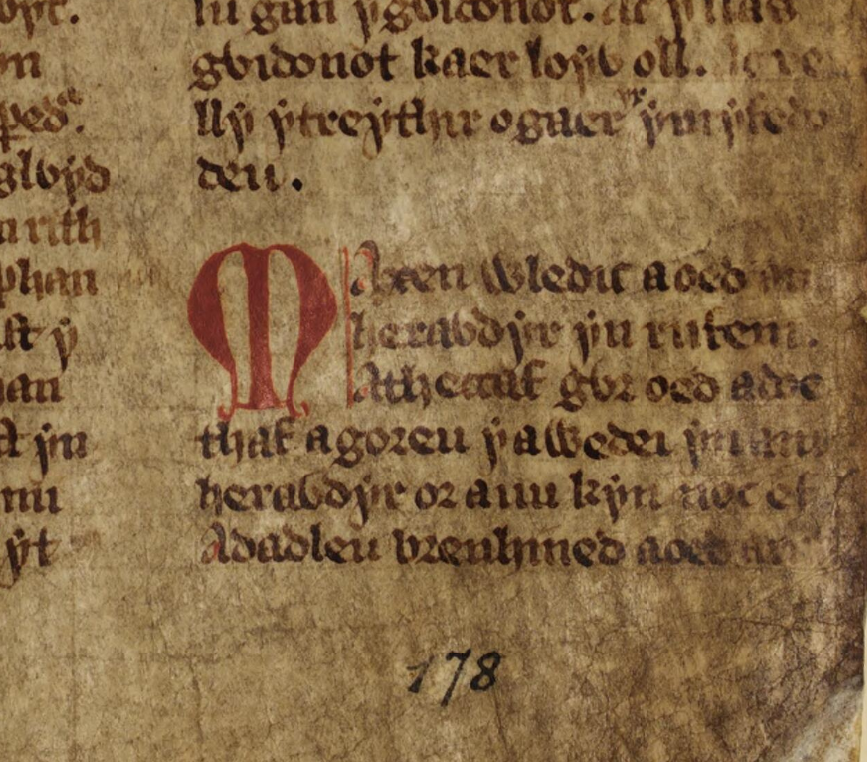
Beginning of The Dream of Macsen Wledig from the White Book of Rhydderch, f.45.r

This account is so different from Geoffrey of Monmouth's account of Maximian (as Geoffrey calls him) in Historia regum Britanniae that scholars agree that the Dream cannot be based purely on Geoffrey's version. The Dream's account also seems to accord better with details in the Triads, so it perhaps reflects an earlier tradition.

Macsen Wledig, the Emperor of Rome, dreams one night of a lovely maiden in a wonderful, far-off land. Awakening, he sends his men all over the earth in search of her. With much difficulty they find her in a rich castle in Britain, daughter of a chieftain based at Segontium (Caernarfon), and lead the Emperor to her. Everything he finds is exactly as in his dream. The maiden, whose name is Helen or Elen, accepts and loves him. Because Elen is found a virgin, Macsen gives her father sovereignty over the island of Britain and orders three castles built for his bride. In Macsen's absence, a new emperor seizes power and warns him not to return. With the help of men from Britain led by Elen's brother Conanus (Welsh: Kynan Meriadec, French: Conan Meriadoc), Macsen marches across Gaul and Italy and recaptures Rome. In gratitude to his British allies, Macsen rewards them with a portion of Gaul that becomes known as Brittany.

==== Lludd and Llefelys ====
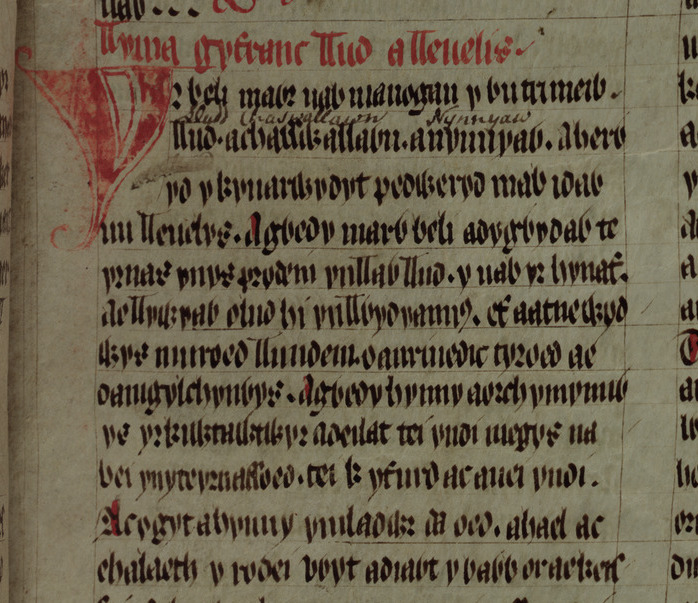
The opening lines of Lludd and Llefelys (Bodleian Library's manuscript)

Another mythological story included in the Mabinogion is the tale of Lludd and Llefelys. Lludd is king of Britain, and his brother, Llefelys, is king of France. Lludd's kingdom is beset by three menaces: the Coraniaid, a demonic people who can hear everything; a terrible scream that is heard every May Eve that terrifies the people; and the continual disappearance of the provisions of the king's court. Lludd asks Llefelys for help, speaking to him through a brass tube so the Coraniaid can't hear. Llefelys creates a potion of crushed insects in water, which destroys the Coraniaid when sprinkled on them. The scream, he discovers, comes from two dragons fighting. He gets the dragons drunk on mead and buries them in Dinas Emrys in what is now North Wales. He then overcomes the wizard who is stealing all of Lludd's provisions and makes him serve Lludd.

==== Hanes Taliesin ====
Guest included Hanes Taliesin in her translation of the Mabinogion, despite the absence of this tale from the White Book of Rhydderch and the Red Book of Hergest. Subsequent scholarship has identified the tale as post-medieval and it is left out of most modern editions of the Mabinogion. Still, elements of the tale predate this presentation. The tale is distinct from the Book of Taliesin, which is a collection of poems attributed to Taliesin.

According to the story, Taliesin began life as Gwion Bach, a servant to the enchantress Ceridwen. Ceridwen had a beautiful daughter and a horribly ugly son named Avagddu (elsewhere known as Morfran). Ceridwen determines to help her son by brewing a magic potion, the first three drops of which will give him the gift of wisdom and inspiration (Welsh: awen). The potion has to be cooked for a year and a day, so Ceridwen enlists a blind man named Morda to tend the fire beneath the cauldron, while Gwion Bach stirs. Three hot drops spill onto Gwion's thumb as he stirred, and he instinctively puts his thumb in his mouth, instantly gaining wisdom and knowledge. The first thought that occurs to him is that Ceridwen will kill him, so he runs away.

Soon enough Ceridwen engages Gwion in a transformation chase in which they turn themselves into various animals – a hare and a greyhound, a fish and an otter, and a bird and a hawk. Exhausted, Gwion finally turns himself into a single grain of corn, but Ceridwen becomes a hen and eats him. Ceridwen becomes pregnant, and when she gives birth she throws the child into the ocean in a leather bag. The bag is found by Elffin, son of Gwyddno Garanhir, who sees the boy's beautiful white brow and exclaims "dyma dal iesin" ("this is a radiant brow") Taliesin, thus named, begins to recite beautiful poetry.

Elffin raises Taliesin as his son, and the two become involved in several adventures. In the presence of Maelgwn, king of Gwynedd, Elffin claims that his wife is as virtuous as the king's wife, and that Taliesin is a better bard than the king's. Maelgwn locks Elffin up and sends his boorish son Rhun to defile Elffin's wife and steal her ring as evidence. However, Taliesin has Elffin's wife replaced with a kitchen maid, thus preserving Elffin's claim. Taliesin then humiliates Maelgwn's bards with his skill, and frees his foster-father.

=== Arthurian tales ===
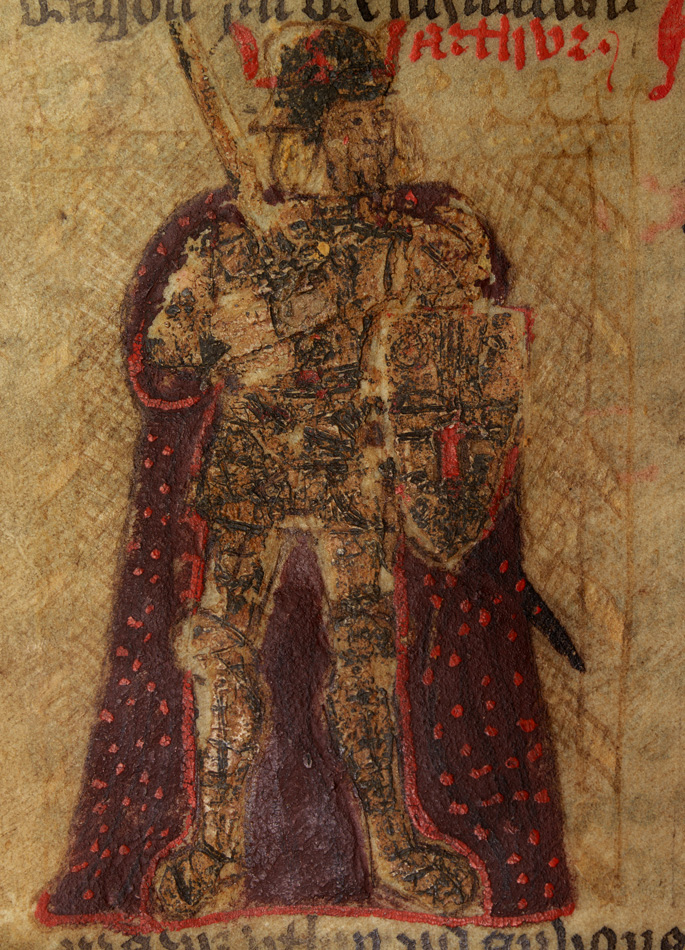
History of the Kings (f.75.v) King Arthur

==== Culhwch and Olwen ====
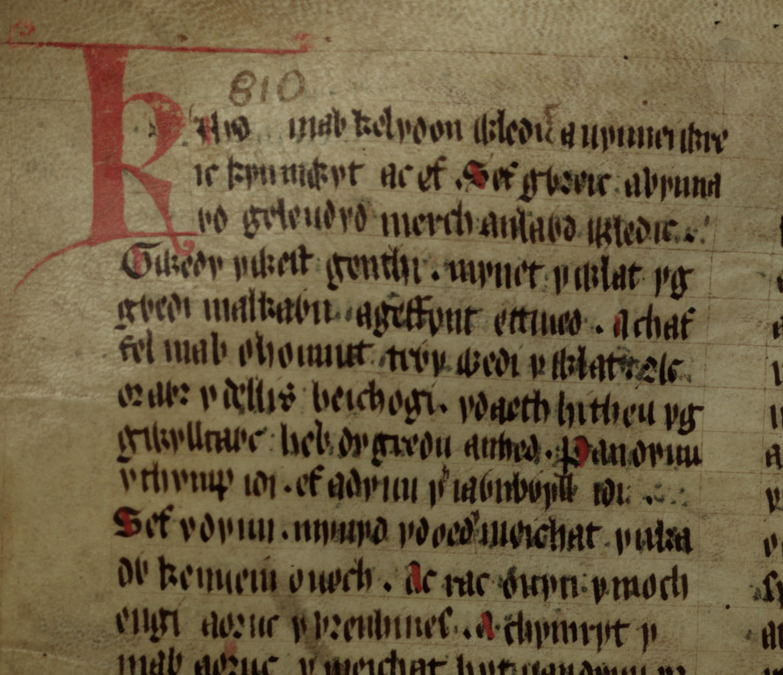
The opening lines of Culhwch and Olwen, from the Red Book of Hergest

While Culhwch and Olwen, also found in the Mabinogion, is primarily an Arthurian tale, in which the hero Culhwch enlists Arthur's aid in winning the hand of Olwen, daughter of Ysbaddaden the Giant, it is full of background detail, much of it mythological in nature. Characters such as Amaethon, the divine ploughman, Mabon ap Modron, the divine son, and the psychopomp Gwyn ap Nudd make appearances, the latter in an endless seasonal battle with Gwythyr ap Greidawl for the hand of Creiddylad. The conditions placed on Culhwch by his mother are similar to those placed on Lleu Llaw Gyffes by Arianrhod, and Culhwch's arrival at Arthur's court is reminiscent of the Irish god Lug's arrival at the court of Nuada Airgetlám in Cath Maige Tuired.

==== Owain, or The Lady of the Fountain ====
The hero of Owain, or the Lady of the Fountain, is based on the historical figure Owain mab Urien. He appears as Ywain in later continental tradition. The romance consists of a hero marrying his love, the Lady of the Fountain, but losing her when he neglects her for knightly exploits. With the aid of a lion he saves from a serpent, he finds a balance between his marital and social duties and rejoins his wife. The narrative is related to Chrétien de Troyes' French romance Yvain, the Knight of the Lion.

==== Peredur son of Efrawg ====
The narrative corresponds to Chrétien's romance Perceval, the Story of the Grail, although, as with the other Welsh romances, scholars still debate the work's exact relationship to Chrétien's poem. It is possible that this romance preserves some of the material found in Chrétien's source. The sequence of some events is altered and many original episodes appear, including the hero's 14-year sojourn in Constantinople reigning with the Empress, which contains remnants of a sovereignty tale. The Holy Grail is replaced with a severed head on a platter. Despite the differences, however, the influence of the French romance cannot be discounted, particularly as its first part hardly matches the second.

The hero's father dies when he is young, and his mother takes him into the woods and raises him in isolation. Eventually he meets a group of knights and determines to become like them, so he travels to King Arthur's court. There he is ridiculed by Cei and sets out on further adventures, promising to avenge Cei's insults to himself and those who defended him. While travelling he meets two of his uncles, the first plays the role of Percival's Gornemant and educates him in arms and warns him not to ask the significance of what he sees. The second replaces Chrétien's Fisher King, but instead of showing Peredur the Holy Grail he reveals a salver containing a man's severed head. The young knight does not ask about this and proceeds to further adventure, including a stay with the Nine Witches of Gloucester and the encounter with the woman who was to be his true love, Angharad Golden-Hand. Peredur returns to Arthur's court, but soon embarks on another series of adventures that do not correspond to material in Percival (Gawain's exploits take up this section of the French work.) Eventually the hero learns the severed head at his uncle's court belonged to his cousin, who had been killed by the Nine Witches of Gloucester. Peredur avenges his family, and is celebrated as a hero.

==== Geraint son of Erbin ====
This narrative corresponds to Chrétien's Erec and Enide, in which the hero is Erec. The romance concerns the love of Geraint, one of King Arthur's men, and the beautiful Enid. The couple marry and settle down together, but rumors spread that Geraint has gone soft. Upset about this, Enid cries to herself that she is not a true wife for keeping her husband from his chivalric duties, but Geraint misunderstands her comment to mean she has been unfaithful to him. He makes her join him on a long and dangerous trip and commands her not to speak to him. Enid disregards this command several times to warn her husband of danger. Several adventures follow that prove Enid's love and Geraint's fighting ability. The couple is happily reconciled in the end, and Geraint inherits his father's kingdom.

==== Preiddeu Annwfn ====
The Spoils of Annwfn is a cryptic early medieval poem of sixty lines found in the Book of Taliesin. The text recounts an expedition to the Otherworld, led by King Arthur, to retrieve a magical cauldron. The speaker relates how he journeyed with Arthur and three boatloads of men into Annwfn, but only seven returned. Annwfn is apparently referred to by several names, including "Mound Fortress," "Four-Peaked Fortress," and "Glass Fortress", though it is possible the poet intended these to be distinct places. Within the Mound Fort's walls Gweir, one of the "Three Exalted Prisoners of Britain" known from the Welsh Triads, is imprisoned in chains. The narrator then describes the cauldron of the Chief of Annwn; it is finished with pearl and will not boil a coward's food. Whatever tragedy ultimately killed all but seven of them is not clearly explained. The poem continues with an excoriation of "little men" and monks, who lack in various forms of knowledge possessed by the poet.

== Characters ==
The Welsh had been Christian for several centuries before their former mythology was written down, and their gods had long been transformed into kings and heroes of the past. Many of the characters who exhibit divine characteristics fall into two rival families, the Plant Dôn ("Children of Dôn") and the Plant Llŷr ("Children of Llŷr").

=== Children of Dôn ===
Gronw and Blodeuwedd

Dôn, daughter of Mathonwy, was the matriarch of one family. Her husband is never specifically named.

- Gwydion: A skilled magician and warrior. Appears most prominently in the fourth branch of the Mabinogi, as well as in the Welsh Triads, the Englynion y Beddau and several poems in the Book of Taliesin.
- Arianrhod: Gwydion's main antagonist; Lleu's mother. According to one of the Welsh Triads, her father was Beli Mawr (see Family of Beli Mawr).
- Eufydd fab Dôn: A character of whom very little is known; probably a reflex of the Gaulish god Ogmios. Appears in two poems from the Book of Taliesin.
- Gilfaethwy: Appears in Math fab Mathonwy, as well as in several French Arthurian tales under the name Griflet filz Do.
- Gofannon: A metalsmith considered to be, like the Irish Goibniu, a reflex of the Gallo-Roman deity Gobannus. He is mentioned in both Culhwch and Olwen and Math fab Mathonwy; in the latter, he is held responsible for the death of his nephew, Dylan.
- Amaethon: Presumed agricultural deity, mentioned in both Culhwch and Olwen and more prominently in Cad Goddeu in which he is the catalyst of a war between Gwynedd and Annwn.

Other figures associated with the Children of Dôn include:

- Math fab Mathonwy: Dôn's brother, a skilled wizard and king of Gwynedd. Appears prominently in the fourth branch of the Mabinogi, as well as in the Welsh Triads and several instances of medieval Welsh verse.
- Dylan ail Don: Firstborn son of Arianrhod, who "took on the nature of the sea" and "swam as well as the best fish that was within." He was killed by his uncle Gofannon. Appears in Math fab Mathonwy and in the "Death Song of Dylan", found in the Book of Taliesin.
- Lleu: Arianrhod's second son and Dylan's twin brother. Appears prominently in the fourth branch of the Mabinogi, which describes his birth, marriage, death, resurrection, and ascension to the throne of Gwynedd, and is also mentioned in the Welsh Triads and in various medieval poems. He is a reflex of the Gaulish deity Lugus and cognate with the Irish god Lugh Lámhfhada.
- Blodeuwedd: A beautiful woman created by Math and Gwydion from flowers as a wife for Lleu, whom she betrayed for her lover, Gronw. Gwydion turned her into an owl for her crimes. Appears in Math fab Mathonwy.
- Gronw "the Radiant": The lord of Penllyn who plotted with Blodeuwedd to kill Lleu. Appears in Math fab Mathonwy.

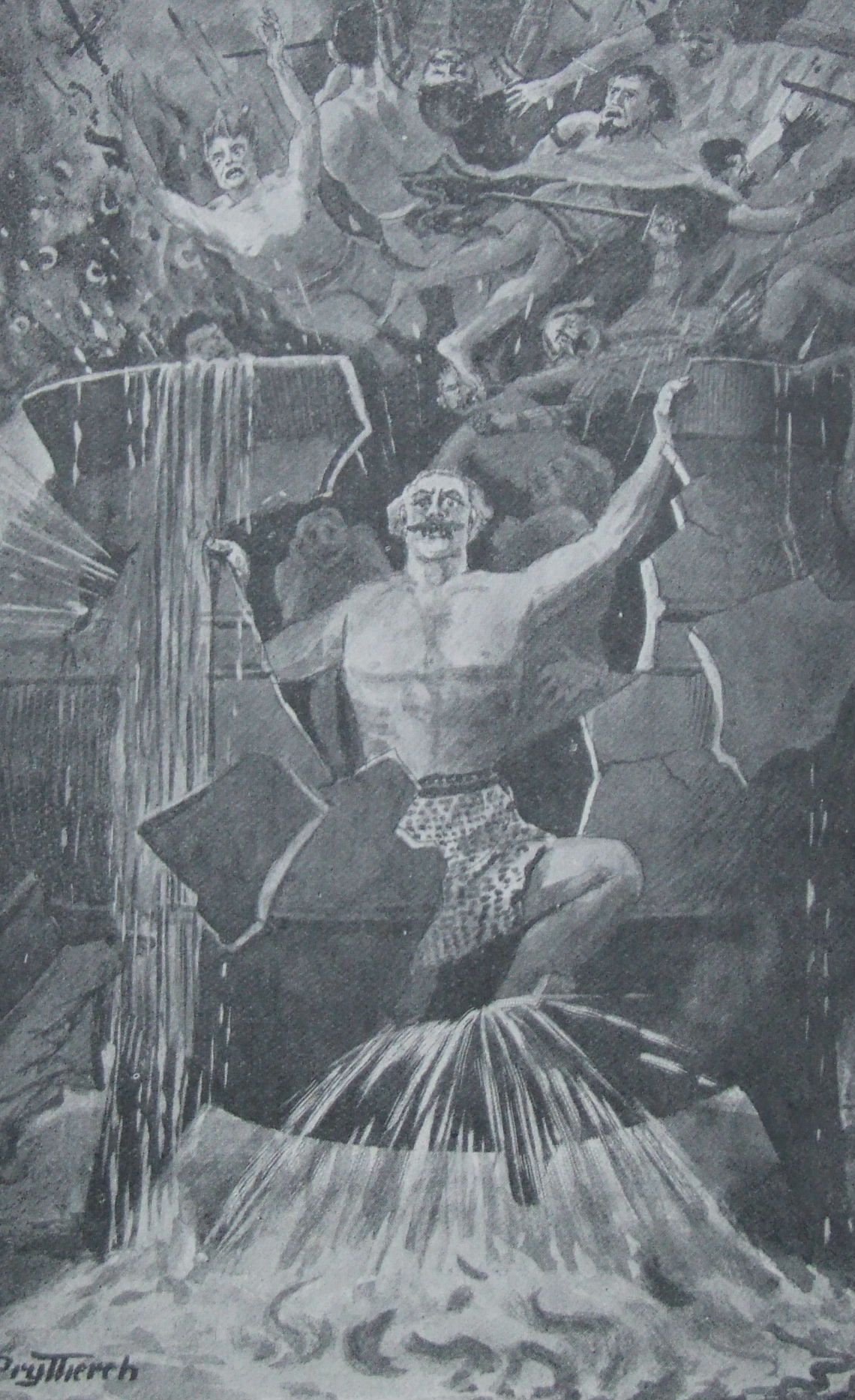
Efnysien's self-sacrifice (image by T. Prytherch)

=== Children of Llŷr ===
Llŷr, the patriarch of the other family, is possibly a borrowing of the Irish sea-god Ler. A foreign origin is further suggested by his epithet Llediaith ("half-speech"). His wife was Penarddun. According to the Mabinogion she was the mother of his three children, plus two others by Euroswydd. The Mabinogi name her as a daughter of Beli Mawr, though this may be an error for sister. Penarddun and Llŷr's children include:

- Brân the Blessed. He appears most prominently in Branwen ferch Llyr, in which is a giant and King of Britain. In the text he invades Ireland to come to the aid of his sister, who has suffered abuse at the hands of the Irish king Matholwch. He is killed in battle by a poisoned spear to the foot. His head was buried in London, and guarded Britain from foreign invasion until its unearthing by King Arthur some time later. Also appears frequently in medieval Welsh poetry, as well as in the Welsh Triads and Cad Goddeu. John T. Koch has suggested a number of parallels between Brân and the historical Gaulish chieftain, Brennus, who invaded the Balkans in the third century B.C.
  - His son Caradog, who is left to defend Britain in his father's absence. He is killed when his uncle Caswallawn seizes his father's crown.
- Manawydan, Bran's younger brother, who fights alongside him in Ireland. He is one of only seven men to survive the final battle, and returns to live in Dyfed with fellow survivor Pryderi. He refuses to make his claim on the British throne which has been usurped by his cousin Caswallawn. He marries Rhiannon in the Third Branch, and rescues Dyfed from the enchantment of the malignant wizard Llwyd ap Cil Coed. He is widely considered to be cognate with the Irish sea god Manannán mac Lir.
- Branwen, The family's only daughter. Her abuse at the hands of her husband Matholwch is the catalyst for a catastrophic war between Britain and Ireland which eventually leads to the deaths of three of her brothers, her son and her husband. She dies of a broken heart after witnessing the battle.
  - Her infant son Gwern, by Matholwch, who is murdered by his uncle Efnysien.

Other figures associated with the Children of Llŷr include:

- Euroswydd, the father of two other children by Pendarddun.
- His sons Efnysien and Nisien, the former twisted, ruthless and sadistic, and largely responsible for the mutually destructive war against the Irish, the latter kind and gentle. Both are killed in the final battle, Efnysien having sacrificed himself to destroy the Pair Dadeni or "Cauldron of Rebirth", which was granting the Irish the temporary victory.
- Matholwch: King of Ireland, who married Branwen thus forging an alliance between his people and Bran's. His mistreatment of his wife led to the British invasion and the eventual destruction of both nations. His death is never described in the narrative, but is implicit.

=== Kingdom of Dyfed ===
Rhiannon and Pryderi

- Pwyll "Head of Annwn": King of Dyfed and eponymous hero of the first branch of the Mabinogi. He swaps places with the otherworldly king Arawn for a year, earning his lifelong friendship, and later wins the lady Rhiannon from her suitor Gwawl.
- Rhiannon: Sometimes associated with the horse goddess Epona. Ronald Hutton states that a horse is the only thing they have in common. Following Pwyll's death at the end of the first branch, she marries Manawydan, the rightful heir to the throne.
- Pryderi: Pwyll and Rhiannon's son, and the king of Dyfed following his father's death. He is the only character to appear in every branch, although with varying degrees of prominence. He fights under Brân in Ireland in the second branch, is imprisoned by the magician Llwyd ap Cil Coed, and later rescued by his stepfather Manawydan in the third, and is killed in single combat against Gwydion in the fourth following the theft of his otherworldly pigs at the magician's hands. He is often equated with the divine son, Mabon ap Modron.
- Cigfa, wife of Pryderi.
- Teyrnon: The lord of Gwent in the service of Pwyll. He finds the infant Pryderi and raises him as his own, returning him to the Demetian court when he is of age. He is mentioned briefly in Culhwch ac Olwen.

=== Family of Beli Mawr ===
Beli Mawr is an ancestor figure mentioned in various sources. Though obscure as a character, several of the many descendants attributed to him figure strongly in Welsh tradition. Works derived from Geoffrey of Monmouth's Historia Regum Britanniae name him as a King of Britain. The Second Branch of the Mabinogi name Beli as the father of Penarddun, though this may be a mistake for brother. Beli's more prominent children include:

- Arianrhod. Usually said to be a daughter of Dôn, Triad 35 gives Beli as her father. Though no other source connects Arianrhod or her family to that of Beli, Rachel Bromwich notes the triad does not necessarily contradict the Mabinogion tradition.
- Caswallawn fab Beli. In the Second Branch of the Mabinogi, he seizes the throne from Caradog ap Bran during Bran's campaigns in Ireland. He appears briefly in the third branch when Manawydan, the rightful claimant, pays homage to him. A large tradition seems to have once surrounded Caswallawn, involving his wars against Julius Caesar and Rome, his love for the maiden Fflur and his eventual departure from Britain with 21,000 men, never to be seen again. Caswallawn is derived from the historical British king Cassivellaunus, who led an alliance of tribes against Caesar in the mid first century.
- Lludd Llaw Eraint and Llefelys, Kings of Britain and Gaul, respectively. In accounts derived from Geoffrey of Monmouth and the tale of Lludd and Llefelys, Lludd becomes King of Britain following Caswallawn, and is responsible for rebuilding London and ridding the kingdom of three plagues that afflict the land with the help of his brother. He was probably the influence for Lud son of Heli, a British king who appears in the writings of Geoffrey of Monmouth. He is also known under the name Nudd Llaw Ereint and is a reflex of the Celtic god Nodens. As Nudd, he is the father of several notable figures in Welsh mythology including:
  - Gwyn ap Nudd: The ruler of Annwfn, the Welsh otherworld and later Christianised into the king of the fairies, the tylwyth teg. He leads the hounds of hell, the Cŵn Annwn on the Wild Hunt, and is intimately associated with Glastonbury Tor. He appears as a member of Arthur's court in Culhwch and Olwen, in which he wages war against Gwythyr ap Greidawl for the hand of his sister Creiddylad, takes part in the hunt for Twrch Trwyth and accompanies Arthur to retrieve the blood of Orddu, the witch of the uplands of hell. He appears several times in the poetry of Dafydd ap Gwilym and is also mentioned in the Black Book of Carmarthen.
  - Edern ap Nudd: A member of Arthur's retinue. He is defeated by Geraint in Geraint ac Enid and command a Danish army in the Battle of Badon against the Saxons in The Dream of Rhonabwy. He is also named as part of Arthur's court in Culhwch ac Olwen.
  - Creiddylad: She is betrothed to Gwythyr ap Greidawl, only to be abducted by her brother Gwyn, thus initiating a war between the two in which Gwyn is victorious. Arthur settles the feud by arranging a duel for her hand every Calan Mai (Kalends of May) until Doomsday.
  - Owain ap Nudd: A member of Arthur's court, mentioned fleetingly in Geraint ac Enid.

=== Others ===
- Arawn
- Ceridwen
- Mabon ap Modron
- Modron
- Taliesin
- Tegid Foel

==== Arthurian characters ====
- Ambrosius (Ambrosius Aurelianus)
- Arthur (King Arthur)
- Bedwyr (Bedivere)
- Cai (Sir Kay)
- Cadwr (Cador)
- Caradoc
- Culhwch
- Drystan (Tristan)
- Essyllt (Iseult)
- Geraint
- Gwalchmai (Gawain)
- Gwalchavad (Galahad)
- Gwenhwyfach
- Gwrtheyrn (Vortigern)
- Gwenhwyfar (Guinevere)
- Mabon ap Modron and Modron
- Macsen Wledig (Magnus Maximus)
- Medrawd
- Myrddin Emrys and Myrddin Wyllt (Merlin)
- Olwen
- Owain mab Urien (Ywain)
- Peredur (Percival)
- Urien
- Uther Pendragon

== King Arthur ==
While Arthurian literature grew to become a broadly European phenomenon, the Welsh can claim the earliest appearances of Arthur. Before Arthur became an international figure, writings and oral tales concerning him were more or less restricted to the Brythonic nations of Wales, Cornwall and Brittany. These tales in turn are divided roughly into Pre-Galfridian Traditions and those of Geoffrey of Monmouth. Wales also contributed to the Arthur of the Romance Tradition after the titular heir became an international sensation.

=== Pre-Galfridian texts ===
- Y Gododdin includes a brief reference of a description of a warrior: "he was no Arthur"
- Several poems of Taliesin: Kadeir Teyrnon ("The Chair of the Prince"), which refers to "Arthur the Blessed", Preiddeu Annwn ("The Spoils of the Annwn"), which recounts an expedition of Arthur to the Otherworld, and Marwnat vthyr pen[dragon] ("The Elegy of Uthyr Pen[dragon]"), which refers to Arthur's valour and is suggestive of a father-son relationship for Arthur and Uthyr that pre-dates Geoffrey of Monmouth.
- From the Black Book of Carmarthen: Pa gur yv y porthaur? ("What man is the gatekeeper?") This takes the form of a dialogue between Arthur and the gatekeeper of a fortress he wishes to enter, in which Arthur recounts the names and deeds of himself and his men, notably Cei and Bedwyr.
- The Welsh prose tale Culhwch and Olwen (c. 1100), included in the modern Mabinogion collection.
- Arthur is referenced numerous times in the Welsh Triads, a collection of short summaries of Welsh tradition; Arthur's court has started to embody legendary Britain as a whole, with "Arthur's Court" sometimes substituted for "The Island of Britain" in the formula "Three XXX of the Island of Britain"
- Historia Britonum: Chapter 56 discusses twelve battles fought and won by Arthur, here called dux bellorum (war leader) rather than king.
- Annales Cambriae contains entries on Arthur, Medrod and Merlin (Myrddin): Year 72 (c. 516) The Battle of Badon, in which Arthur carried the cross of our Lord Jesus Christ on his shoulders for three days and three nights and the Britons were victors; Year 93 (c. 537) The Strife of Camlann in which Arthur and Medraut fell [and there was death in Britain and in Ireland.] Text in brackets not in MSS. B or C.; Year 129 (c. 573) The Battle of Arfderydd (Armterid, A; Erderit, B; Arderit, C) [between the sons of Elifer, and Guendoleu son of Keidau; in which battle Guendoleu fell; and Merlin (Merlinus) went mad.] Text in brackets found only in MS. B.
- Several Saints's Lives: Arthur features in a number of well known vitae ("Lives") of post-Roman saints. Life of Saint Gildas, written in the early 12th century by Caradoc of Llancarfan; of Saint Cadoc, written around 1100 or a little before by Lifris of Llancarfan; medieval biographies of Carannog, Padarn and Eufflam, probably written around the 12th century; a less obviously legendary account of Arthur appears in the Legenda Sancti Goeznovii, which is often claimed to date from the early 11th century; William of Malmesbury's De Gestis Regum Anglorum and Herman's De miraculis sanctae Mariae Laudunensis, which together provide the first certain evidence for a belief that Arthur was not actually dead and would at some point return.

=== Geoffrey of Monmouth ===
- Prophetiae Merlini: Geoffrey presented a series of apocalyptic narratives as the work of the earlier Merlin who, until Geoffrey's book came out, was known as "Myrddin". The first work about this legendary prophet in a language other than Welsh, it was widely read — and believed — much as the prophecies of Nostradamus were centuries later; John Jay Parry and Robert Caldwell note that the Prophetiae Merlini "were taken most seriously, even by the learned and worldly wise, in many nations", and list examples of this credulity as late as 1445.
- Historia Regum Britanniae: After the Romans leave, Vortigern comes to power, and invites the Saxons under Hengist and Horsa to fight for him as mercenaries, but they rise against him, and Britain remains in a state of war under Aurelius Ambrosius and his brother Uther Pendragon, assisted by the wizard Merlin. Uther's son Arthur defeats the Saxons so severely that they cease to be a threat until after his death. In the meantime, Arthur conquers most of northern Europe and ushers in a period of peace and prosperity that lasts until the Roman emperor Lucius Tiberius demands that Britain once again pay tribute to Rome. Arthur defeats Lucius in Gaul, but his nephew Modred seizes the throne in his absence. Arthur returns and kills Modred, but, mortally wounded, he is carried off to the isle of Avalon, and hands the kingdom to his cousin Constantine. With Arthur gone, the Saxons return, and become more and more powerful. The line of British kings continues until the death of Cadwallader, after which the Saxons become the rulers of Britain.
- Vita Merlini: This is in part Geoffrey's retelling of the earlier Myrddin legend from Welsh tradition, but includes numerous other source materials as well, and includes elements of the tradition of saints' lives as well as the sort of encyclopaedic knowledge of the natural world and the heavens then in vogue at Oxford. The work, Geoffrey's only known poem, was written in Latin verse (hexameter).

=== Welsh Arthurian romance ===
Each of these tales are contained within the modern Mabinogion collection, and are likely based on the romances of Chrétien de Troyes (though it is possible that they may have had a common Celtic source). See the above section on "The Three Romances" in The Mabinogion for details on these tales.

- Owain, or The Lady of the Fountain
- Peredur Son of Efrawg
- Gereint Son of Erbin

== Folklore ==
=== Mythical creatures ===
- Adar Llwch Gwin, giant birds that understand human languages
- Afanc, a lake monster (exact lake varies by the story)
- Bendith y Mamau, another term for the Tylwyth Teg or Welsh fairy folk, translated as Blessings of the Mothers (Mother Goddesses).
- Brenin Llwyd, a silent, ghostly and semi-corporeal figure found in mountainous locations across Wales. The Brenin Llwyd is described as being cloaked in mist and preying on unwary travellers and children.
- Bwbach (plural Bwbachod), a household spirit similar to a brownie or hobgoblin, industrious but mischievous. They are good-natured and expect only a nightly bowl of cream for their services. However, they have a dislike of clergymen and teetotalers, upon whom they will play relentless pranks.
- Bwca, a brownie that will perform housework in return for bread and milk, but if disrespected he may become angry and violent before abandoning the home. Tricking him into revealing his name will also cause him to leave. They are not normally mischievous, but in one tale the bwca had a human friend who was sent off to war and killed. The bwca became distraught and played disruptive pranks until a cunning-man (magician) was brought in to banish him from the house.
- Ceffyl Dŵr, a water horse similar to the Kelpie
- Cewri (Giants), such as Ysbaddaden Bencawr from Culhwch and Olwen, and Brân from the Four Branches of the Mabinogi.
- Coblynau, little people and mine spirits like the Knocker
- Coraniaid, a mysterious race of beings who plagued the Island of Britain
- Cŵn Annwn, hunting dogs of the Otherworld
- Cyhyraeth, death spirit
- Y Diawl (The Devil) who was said to have built various bridges in Wales (including Devil's Bridge, Ceredigion), and to appear to sinners in the form of a horned, black-faced shepherd leading a pack of dogs. Sometimes associated with the bobtailed black sow known as Yr Hwch Ddu Gwta.
- Dreigiau (Dragons), the most famous being Y Ddraig Goch.
- Y Dyn Hysbys (The Wise Man), or wizard. These could be clerics, men who learned about medicine and black magic from books, and those who claimed to inherit power from their families and thus could foresee the future, particularly on an Ysbrydnos, and give charms to ward off evil.
- Gwiddonod (Witches), old women who could cast spells over people and animals, ride broomsticks through the air, tell fortunes, and use charms to heal and cause diseases. They could take the form of a hare, and could only be killed with a silver bullet. Only Y Dyn Hysbys could undo the harm they cause.
- Gwragedd Annwn, beautiful lake maidens.
- Gwyllgi, a large black dog that haunts lonely roads.
- Gwyllion, mountain spirits resembling hags.
- Llamhigyn y Dŵr, winged toad lake creature also known as a water leaper.
- Mallt-y-Nos, female spirits of Annwn, associated with the Wild Hunt.
- Morgens, water spirits
- Plentyn Newid, the Welsh take on the Changeling creature.
- Pwca, shapeshifting animal spirit
- Tylwyth Teg, literally "the Fair Folk," the common name in Welsh for the fairy folk, inhabitants of the Otherworld
- Ysbrydion (spirits), which are more likely to come in contact with humans on an Ysbrydnos or "spirit night" (see Calan Gaeaf, Calan Mai)

=== Folk narrative ===
Includes folk tales, legends, traditions and anecdotes. The cyfarwyddiaid (singular: cyfarwydd, "storyteller"), were members of the bardic order in Wales. The only historical cyfarwydd known by name is Bledri ap Cydifor ('Bledericus Walensis', 'Bleherus').

The cyfawyddiaid were considered a learned class with duties and an education that exceeded that of a common poet. They were court officials with extensive training in their art, and often had a close relationship with their lord. Their duties extended to the traditions involved in praising, celebrating and mourning their lord. Welsh folklore includes a number of tales that were preserved and told by the cyfarwyddiaid, who were also tasked with conserving the traditional historical material, the accepted myth of the Welsh past, and sharing the corresponding stories, being considered as historians themselves. Besides storytelling, the cyfarwyddiaid also had the task of protecting the genealogies of the powerful families.

The tales of Welsh lore were shared as proverbs and songs, in addition to simple spoken stories. The historical tales were told along with the non-historical fables, without significant distinction. This allowed culture and history to be explored and taught through the poetics of the time. In earlier periods, the penceirddiaid are believed to have narrated stories in the courts of princes and nobles. Later, the stories were told by the cyfarwyddiaid for audiences other than nobility.

The writing of medieval folklore had adopted and explored a set of rules and themes. It relied on the poetic triads of the time, poetics, old verse and knowledge of histories, which enabled the conception of well-crafted stories about the historical truths of the population. Additionally, regions would adopt their own guidelines in storymaking, such as the Triads of the Island of Britain, which led tales to be based on mythological, historical and heroic themes. The writing also followed structure, having a chronological series of events in short episodes, known as features, which reflect the oral origins of the tales for easy story-telling to the audiences.

Welsh folklore was often compared to Irish literature of similar value. They both consisted of similar structure and aimed to inform about the past, rather than to target the mistakes of their ancestry with satire. The form of these tales also mimicked that of early Irish sagas, being prose sprinkled with poetry. Moreover, the conservation of Irish tales was also performed by a class of gentry, much like the cyfarwyddiaid of Wales. However, even with other similar duties, the Irish bards were not story-tellers. That role was saved for the poets in Ireland.

This type of storytelling, in both Ireland and Wales, was believed to have arisen through spiritual inspiration. The poets spoke ‘through’ great knowledge, which was sometimes thought to be acquired only by the practice of divination, a concept known as ái in Irish, and awen in Welsh. The Welsh cyfarwyddiaid were thus considered awenyddion, able to deliver prophetic speech in a possessed state of awen. This is not the only ritual practice that evolved around Welsh folklore, as other customs have originated from the tales themselves.

Folk tales and legends have also survived through retellings by common people. Storytelling could and does occur in many different forms: "gossip, games, dancing, and the reciting of riddles, tongue-twisters, nursery-rhymes, harp-stanzas, folk-songs and ballads." Common occasions for telling folk narratives were the nosweithiau llawen (or "merry evenings," similar to a céilidh), nosweithiau gwau ("knitting nights"), and Calan Gaeaf (Winter's Eve).

==== Tales about animals with human characteristics ====
The most famous of these are the tales concerning the "Oldest Animals," in which a character gathers information from different animals until the oldest animal is located. Culhwch and Olwen lists the Blackbird of Cilgwri, the Stag of Rhedynfre, the Owl of Cwm Cowlyd, the Eagle of Gwernabwy, and the Salmon of Llyn Llyw. The Triad "The Three Elders of the World" lists several of the oldest birds.

==== Formula tales ====
Including cumulative tales and stories without end.

==== Humour about actual persons or types ====
Includes White Lie Tales, which are obviously and intentionally untrue. Common elements include the narrator's experiences in America, adventures while being carried on wings of a large bird, growing enormous vegetables, prowess at shooting around corners, ability to see over great distances, buying a hare's egg at Pwllheli Fair. Famous recent authors in this genre are James Wade (Shemi Wad), Daniel Thomas (Daniel y Pant), Gruffydd Jones (Y Deryn Mawr) and John Pritchard (Siôn Ceryn Bach).

==== (Pseudo-)histories of notable figures ====
- Arthur (see separate section above)
- Twm Siôn Cati, often called the Welsh Robin Hood
- The Lives of Saints, originally written in Latin, and usually stressing a male saint's conception, birth and childhood, while emphasizing a female saint's adolescence, virginity and sexual conflict (fleeing marriage or rape). These include the Life of St. David by Rhygyfarch, and the Life of Cadog by Lifris of Llancarfan. The MSS Cotton Vespasian Axiv, written around 1200, collects the lives of numerous saints. Another important collection is The Book of the Anchorite of Llanddewibrefi.

==== Local legends of historical or pseudo-historical figures ====
Includes Gwylliaid Cochion Mawddwy, a group of bandits who lived in Merioneth in the 16th century, mentioned in Thomas Pennant's Tours of Wales and other sources.

Also includes the legend of Gelert, the namesake of the town of Beddgelert (whose name means "Gelert's Grave") in the Gwynedd area of Wales. The folktale is said to take place in the 13th century, and acts as a moral story about making hasty and rash decisions. In the legend, Llywelyn the Great, then-Prince of North Wales returned from hunting to find his baby missing, the cradle overturned, and his faithful hound Gelert with blood-stained fur and teeth. Believing the dog had killed his child and heir, Llywelyn drew his sword and killed Gelert. After the dog's dying yelp, Llywelyn heard the cries of his baby, unharmed and behind the cradle, along with a dead wolf which had attacked the child and been killed by Gelert. Llywelyn is overcome with sorrow and buries the dog, traumatised from its dying yelp. After that day, Llywelyn was said to never smile again.

==== Place-name or topography tales ====
Includes onomastic lore, which explains place-names. One notable example comes from the Historia Britonum, in which the name 'Carn Cafal' is shown to come from a carn (or pile of stones) which mark the footprint of Arthur's dog Cafal.

==== Collectors of folk tales ====
- Poet-scholars: Rhys Meurig (Rice Merrick), George Owen of Henllys.
- Antiquarians: Edward Lhuyd, the Morris Brothers of Anglesey, Iolo Morganwg.
- Folklorists: Daniel Silvan Evans (Y Brython, 1858), Peter Roberts (Cambrian Popular Antiquities, 1815), W. Howells (Cambrian Superstitions, 1831), Isaac Foulkes (Cymru Fu, 1862), Wirt Sikes (British Goblins, 1880), Daniel Silvan Evans, John Jones and others (Ysten Sioned), Elias Owen (Welsh Folklore, 1896), Marie Trevelyan (Folklore and Folk Stories of Wales, 1909), J. Ceredig Davies (Folk-Lore of West and Mid-Wales, 1911).

=== Voyage tales ===
- Preiddeu Annwfn, in which Arthur sails to Annwn (the Otherworld) to retrieve a magic cauldron (possibly a predecessor to the Grail)
- The Madoc legend, concerning a Welsh prince's discovery of America in 1170.

== Travelogue ==
Gerald of Wales mentions numerous aspects of current Welsh mythology and folklore in his books Itinerarium Cambriae (1191) and Descriptio Cambriae (1194)

== National histories ==
While the following works are considered histories, they recount what would become a common myth of origin for the Welsh.

- Historia Britonum
- Annales Cambriae
- The works of Geoffrey of Monmouth

== Legacy of Welsh mythology in English literature ==
- Arthurian tales: See King Arthur
- The Mabinogion: See Mabinogion; William Morris, published in 1872 Love is Enough, a poetic drama based on a story in the Mabinogion, illustrated with Burne-Jones woodcuts.; John Cowper Powys, in his Welsh novels, Owen Glendower (1941) and Porius (1951), makes use of the mythology found in The Mabinogion.
- Taliesin: Thomas Love Peacock's The Misfortunes of Elphin (about the character from the Taliesin tales, 1829); John Cowper Powys, Porius: A Romance of the Dark Ages (1951). Blodeuwedd, Myrddin Wyllt, and King Arthur also appears in Porius.
- Madoc: See Madoc

== See also ==
- Breton mythology
- Cornish mythology
- Matter of Britain
- Welsh-language literature
- Welsh literature in English
- Proto-Celtic paganism

== Sources ==
- MacCarthy, Fiona (1994). William Morris: A Life for Our Time. London: Faber. ISBN 0-571-14250-8.
- Mackail, J.W. (1901). The Life of William Morris: Volume One (new ed.). London, New York, and Bombay: Longmans, Green & Co.
- Thompson, E.P. (1955). William Morris: Romantic to Revolutionary. London: Lawrence & Wishart.
