= Nisien =

Welsh mythological character

Nisien is a figure in Welsh mythology, the son of Penarddun and Euroswydd and twin brother of Efnysien. He appears in the Second Branch of the Mabinogi, which names Brân the Blessed, Branwen, and Manawydan as his half-siblings. Nisien, also Nissyen, was the opposite of his brother Efnisien in personality. He was tranquil and generous, while Efnisien was vindictive and destructive.
