= Llŷr =

Welsh mythology figure

Llŷr (Welsh: Llŷr Llediaith (Welsh pronunciation: [ˈɬɨːr ˈɬɛðjaiθ]); Lleddiaith meaning 'half-speech' or 'half-language') was likely a sea-god in Welsh mythology, related to the Irish Ler ('the Sea'), father of Manannán mac Lir.

In some legends, he is the leader of the Children of Llyr, who are constantly at war with the Children of Dôn.

Llŷr appears as the father of Brân, Brânwen and Manawydan by Penarddun in the Branwen, Daughter of Llyr, the Second Branch of the Mabinogi. In some sources, he is the father of Creidylad instead of Lludd.

The Welsh Triads states that Llŷr was imprisoned by Euroswydd, and presumably, Penarddun subsequently married Euroswydd, giving birth by Euroswydd to her two younger sons, Nisien and Efnisien, as stated in the Second Branch.

William Shakespeare's play King Lear is based on material taken secondhand (through Raphael Holinshed) from Geoffrey of Monmouth's mythical king King Leir, who has often been connected, but is likely unrelated, to Llŷr.

== The House of Llŷr ==
Beli mab Mynogan
Llŷr	Penarddun	Euroswydd
Brân the Blessed(♂)	Manawydan(♂)	Rhiannon	Pwyll	Brânwen(♀)	Matholwch	Nisien(♂)	Efnisien(♂)

(*) Unbordered names are figures not in Llŷr's line of descent, though perhaps members of the extended family.
(*) This stemma is subject to further elaboration. If the Beli above is to be equated with Beli Mawr then Caswallawn stands as Penarddun's sibling. But Bromwich observes that Penarddun should be emended to being the sister of Beli, which would bring consistency with statement elsewhere that Caswallawn and Brân are cousins.

== See also ==
- The House of Dôn
