= Matholwch =

Character in the Second Branch of the Mabinogi

Matholwch, King of Ireland, is a character in the Second Branch of the Mabinogi, the tale of Branwen ferch Llŷr.

The story opens with Bendigeidfran (Bran the Blessed), giant and king of Britain, sitting on a rock by the sea at Harlech and seeing the vessels of Matholwch approaching. Matholwch has come to ask for the hand of Bendigeidfran's sister Branwen in marriage. Bendigeidfran agrees to this, and a feast is held to celebrate the betrothal. While the feast is going on, Efnisien, a half-brother of Branwen and Bendigeidfran, arrives and asks why there were celebrations. On being told, he is furious that his half-sister has been given in marriage without his consent and vents his spleen by mutilating Matholwch's horses. Matholwch is deeply offended but is conciliated by Bran who gives him Pair Dadeni, a magical cauldron known as the cauldron of rebirth, which can bring the dead to life.

Once they are married, Matholwch treats Branwen cruelly and she is forced to work in the kitchens. Branwen tames a starling and gives it a message to carry across the Irish Sea to Bran, who sets out for Ireland to rescue her. When Matholwch sees the giant, he asks for peace and builds a house big enough for him. Matholwch agrees to give the kingdom to Gwern, his son by Branwen. The Irish lords do not like the idea, so they hide themselves in flour bags to attack the Welsh. Efnisien guesses what is happening and kills them by squeezing their heads inside the sacks, then throws Gwern into the fire.

In the ensuing war, all the Irish are killed save for five pregnant women who repopulate the island, while only seven of the Welsh survive to return home with Branwen, taking with them the severed head of Bendigeidfran. On landing in Wales at Aber Alaw Branwen dies of grief that so much destruction has been caused on her account.

== See also ==
- Mal mac Rochride
