= Grassholm =

Island and Site of Special Scientific Interest in Wales

Native name: Ynys Gwales
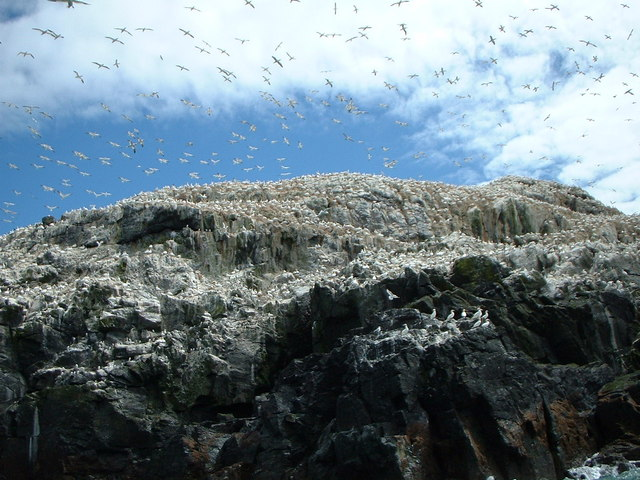
- Grassholm
- Interactive map of Grassholm

Geography
- Location: SM 597 093
- Coordinates: 51°43′52″N 5°28′47″W
- Area: 10.72 ha (26.5 acres)
- Highest elevation: 42 m (138 ft)

Administration
- United Kingdom
- County: Pembrokeshire
- Community: Marloes and St Brides

Demographics
- Population: Uninhabited

Grassholm (Welsh: Gwales or Ynys Gwales) or Grassholm Island is a small uninhabited island situated 13 kilometres (8 mi) off the southwestern Pembrokeshire coast in Wales, lying west of Skomer, in the community of Marloes and St Brides. It is the westernmost point in Wales other than the isolated rocks on which the Smalls Lighthouse stands. Grassholm is known for its huge colony of northern gannets; the island has been owned since 1947 by the Royal Society for the Protection of Birds, and is one of its oldest reserves. It reaches 42 metres (138 ft) tall.

Grassholm National Nature Reserve is the third most important site for gannets in the world, after two sites in Scotland: St Kilda and Bass Rock. It serves as a breeding site for 39,000 pairs of the birds, and supports around 10 per cent of the world population. The turbulent sea around Grassholm is a good feeding area for porpoises and bottlenose dolphins.

The island has a significant problem with marine plastic, brought to the island by breeding gannets, as nesting material which the birds have mistaken for seaweed floating in the surrounding waters. The problem has been ongoing through twelve years of RSPB conservation to 2017, and surveys have indicated that 80% of nests contain waste plastics.

Boats sail to Grassholm from St Davids Lifeboat Station and Martin's Haven on the mainland, but members of the public are not permitted to land.

Geologically, the island is largely formed from keratophyre, though the northwest coast and the islet of West Tump are formed from basalt. A couple of NE-SW aligned faults cross the island. Raised beaches are present in places.

== In mythology ==
Grassholm has been identified with Gwales, an island in the medieval Welsh story Branwen ferch Llŷr (Branwen the daughter of Llŷr), one of the Four Branches of the Mabinogi. Gwales is the site of a fabulous castle where the severed head of Brân the Blessed is kept miraculously alive for eighty years while his companions feast in blissful forgetfulness, until the opening of a forbidden door that faces Cornwall recalls them to their sorrow and the need to bury the head at the White Mount (the Tower of London). Brân is the Welsh for 'raven', which has a legendary connection with the Tower of London.

And at the end of the seventh year they set out for Gwales in Penfro. And there was for them there a fair royal place overlooking the sea, and a great hall it was. [...] And that night they were there without stint, and were joyful. [...] And there they passed the fourscore years so that they were not aware of having ever spent a time more joyous and delightful than that. It was not more irksome, nor could any tell of his fellow that he was older during that time, than when they came there. Nor was it more irksome having the head with them then than when Bendigeidfran had been with them alive. And because of those fourscore years it was called the Assembly of the Wondrous Head.

— from Branwen ferch Llŷr (Branwen Daughter of Llŷr), translated by Gwyn Jones and Thomas Jones

== Shipwreck ==
On 15 July 1945, the cargo ship Walter L M Russ ran aground on Grassholm and sank. Nine crew were rescued by the Angle Lifeboat.

== See also ==
- Brân the Blessed
- Branwen
- The Private Life of the Gannets

Northern Gannets recorded on Grassholm
