= Daneți =

- Commune
- Location in Romania
- Coordinates: 43°59′N 24°3′E
- Country: Romania
- County: Dolj
- Area: 95.11 km^{2} (36.72 sq mi)
- Population (2021-12-01): 5,131
  - Density: 53.95/km^{2} (139.7/sq mi)
- Time zone: UTC+02:00 (EET)
  - Summer (DST): UTC+03:00 (EEST)
- Vehicle reg.: DJ

Daneți is a commune in Dolj County, Oltenia, Romania with a population of 7,211 people. It is composed of four villages: Brabeți, Braniște, Daneți and Locusteni.

Most of the village's population are farmers. Principal agricultural crops are corn, grain, and grapes: householders also maintain individual vegetable gardens. Daneţi offers a few very small shops where bread and other products needed daily can be bought. Electricity is offered as well as internet connection for a small fee. Daneţi is 50 kilometers from the nearest big city, Craiova. Transportation to and from the town is provided by a bus that run every 30 minutes from 6am to 6pm.
