= Manawydan =

Welsh literary figure

Manawydan fab Llŷr is a figure of Welsh mythology, the son of Llŷr and the brother of Brân the Blessed and Brânwen. The first element in his name is cognate with the stem of the name of the Irish sea god Manannán mac Lir, and likely originated from the same Celtic deity as Manannán. Unlike Manannán, however, no surviving material connects him with the sea in any way except for his patronymic (llŷr is an old Welsh word for sea). Manawydan's most important appearances occur in the Second and Third Branches of the Mabinogi (the latter of which is named for him), but he is also referenced frequently in medieval poetry and the Welsh Triads.

== The Mabinogi ==
=== Second Branch ===
Manawydan is an important character in the Second Branch of the Mabinogi, the Mabinogi of Brânwen, Daughter of Llŷr. In this tale, Manawydan serves as advisor to his brother Brân the Blessed, the King of Britain. He sits beside Brân at the feast celebrating the wedding of their sister Brânwen to Matholwch, king of Ireland, an occasion which is meant to solidify an alliance. When their half-brother Efnisien, upset that he has not been consulted, mutilates Matholwch's horses, Brân sends Manawydan to offer recompense. Later, when word gets back to Britain that Matholwch has been mistreating Brânwen, Manawydan joins Brân's rescue effort.

In the ensuing war, Manawydan is one of only seven men to survive. The mortally wounded Brân asks Manawydan and the others to cut off his head and take it back to Britain; it will continue speaking and keeping them company in the meantime. They come to a wondrous castle on the island of Gwales, where they enjoy a great feast and forget their sorrows. Manawydan recognizes opening the door of the castle "facing Cornwall" will break the spell, but one day his companion Heilyn son of Gwyn grows overcurious and opens it, and all their sorrows return. The group takes Brân's head to the White Hill (the location of the Tower of London) and buries it there, where it serves as a talisman against foreign invasion.

=== Third Branch ===
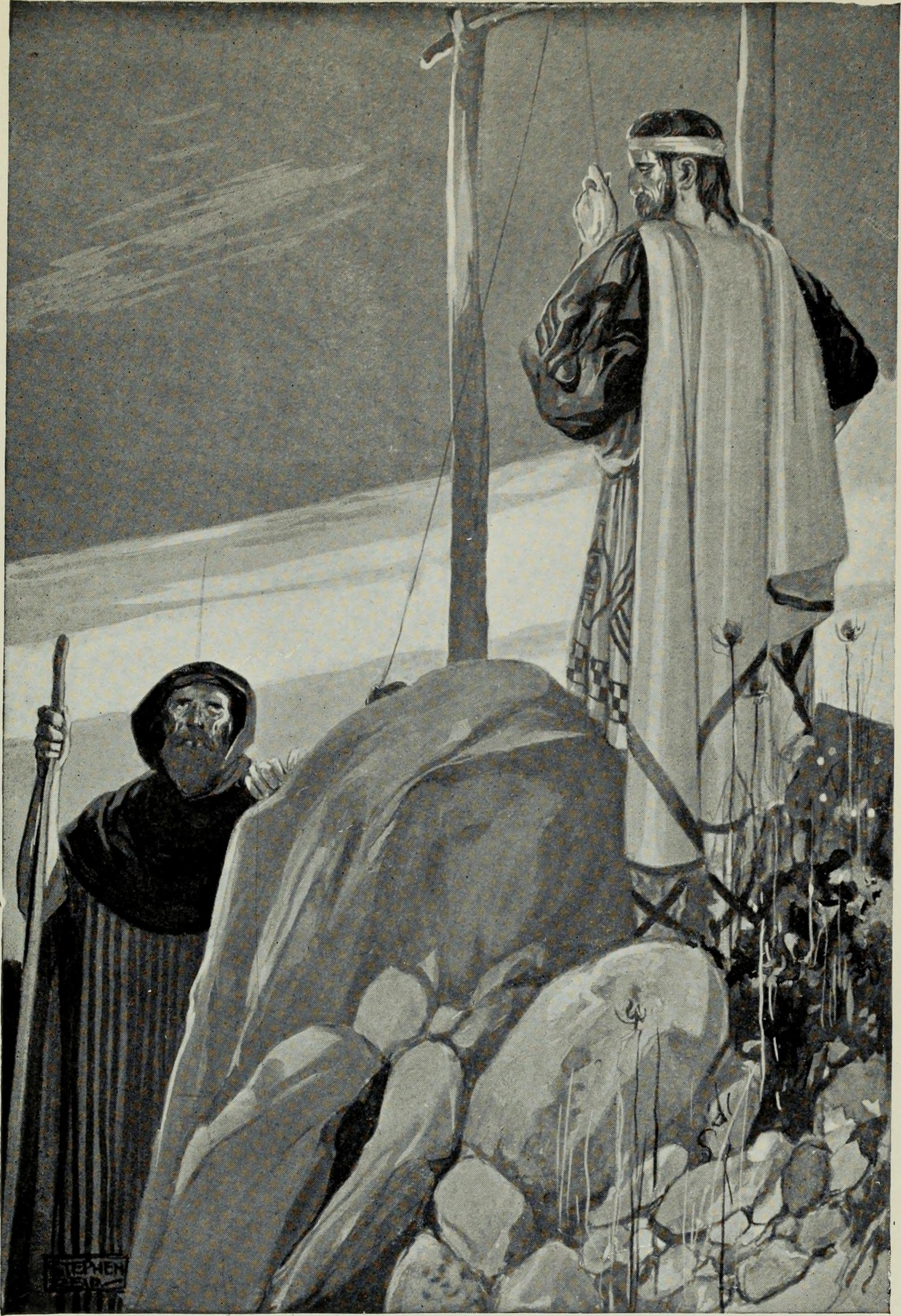
Manawyddan is hanging a mouse

Manawydan plays an even greater role in the Third Branch of the Mabinogi. In this tale, one of Manawydan's fellow survivors, Pryderi, invites him to live with him in Dyfed and marry Rhiannon, Pryderi's mother after they both returned from the fighting in Ireland (in the Second Branch). Soon, a spell caused all the people and domestic animals in Dyfed to disappear, leaving only Rhiannon, Pryderi and his wife Cigfa, and Manawydan. They lived by hunting for a while then went to England to make a living as craftsmen, but the excellence of their work led to the other craftsmen plotting to kill them out of jealousy, so that eventually they returned to Dyfed.

One day, Manawydan and Pryderi, while out hunting, saw a white boar which they followed. It went into a mysterious fort. Pryderi followed and didn't return. On hearing the story, Rhiannon too went into the fort and found Pryderi stuck rigid and speechless to a golden bowl in the middle of the floor. She too touched the bowl and became stuck, a mist descended and the fort then disappeared.

Manawydan and Cigfa again were forced to try to make a living in England and again were driven away by jealous rivals. This time, Manawydan brought back wheat and sowed three crofts, but as they became ready for reaping, he found the first two stripped bare overnight. He guarded the third croft and saw a multitude of mice stealing the corn. He caught one which seemed slow and fat. The next day, he started trying to hang it for stealing. Three strangers approached and offered to ransom the mouse, and by refusing to agree Manawydan was able to persuade the third stranger, a bishop, to remove the curse on Dyfed and release Pryderi and Rhiannon.

All three strangers turned out to be Llwyd ap Cil Coed in disguise, who placed the spell upon the golden bowl. Llwyd told Manawydan that he was a friend of Gwawl (from the First Branch) and had enchanted Dyfed and captured Rhiannon and Pryderi in revenge for the insult done to Gwawl by Pwyll (Pryderi's father and Rhiannon's first husband). The mouse turned out to be the wife of Llwyd, who had gone with the other women of Llwyd's court disguised as mice to steal the grain (the previous two nights, it had been Llwyd's warband). She was pregnant, which made her slower than the rest. While in captivity, Rhiannon had to carry the yokes of the horses, while Pryderi had to carry the gate hammers.

== Other appearances ==
Manawydan is mentioned in the poem known as "Pa gur yv y porthaur" ("What Man is the Gatekeeper?"), where he is named as one of the warriors in King Arthur's retinue. The poem praises him as providing worthy counsel and for splintering shields at a place called Tryfrwyd; later in the poem this battle is associated with cinbin or dogheads and a figure known as Garwlwyd (Rough-Gray). Tryfrwyd shows up as the Battle of Tribuit in the Historia Brittonum and in later works.

In How Culhwch Won Olwen, Manawydan appears once again as a knight of Arthur's and takes part in the hunting of the Twrch Trwyth. He is mentioned twice in Trioedd Ynys Prydein; he is named as one of the "Three Golden Shoemakers of the Island of Britain", a reference to his role as a shoemaker in Manawydan uab Llyr, and as one of the "Three Prostrate Chieftains of the Island of Britain", a reference to his submission to the usurper Caswallon. Reference is made to the "land of Manawyd" in the epic poem Y Gododdin.

=== Modern ===
In 2001, the Yu-Gi-Oh! video game The Duelists of the Roses included an antagonistic figure named Manawyddan fab Llyr, an incarnation to the villain Darknite. Two years later in the 2003 film Otherworld, Manawydan was portrayed by Welsh actor Daniel Evans. Manawydan appeared as a vengeful sea god in Bernard Cornwell's Warlord Chronicles.

== General and cited references ==
- Bromwich, Rachel (2006). Trioedd Ynys Prydein: The Triads of the Island of Britain. University of Wales Press. ISBN 0-7083-1386-8.
- Green, Thomas (2007). Concepts of Arthur. Stroud, Gloucestershire, UK: Tempus. ISBN 978-0-7524-4461-1.
