= Afon Alaw =

River on Anglesey, Wales

Coordinates: 53.30293°N 4.54851°W

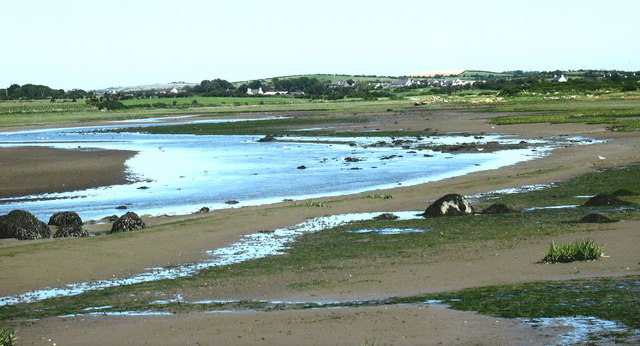
The estuary of Afon Alaw at low tide, near to Newlands Park, Isle of Anglesey, Wales.

Afon Alaw (Welsh for 'River Alaw') is a river on Anglesey, Wales which rises near Llanerch-y-medd and flows northwards into the reservoir of Llyn Alaw. Below the dam it then flows southwestwards to the island's west coast near Llanfachraeth. Its lower reaches, west of the A5025 road, are tidal.
