= Pair Dadeni =

Magical cauldron in Welsh mythology

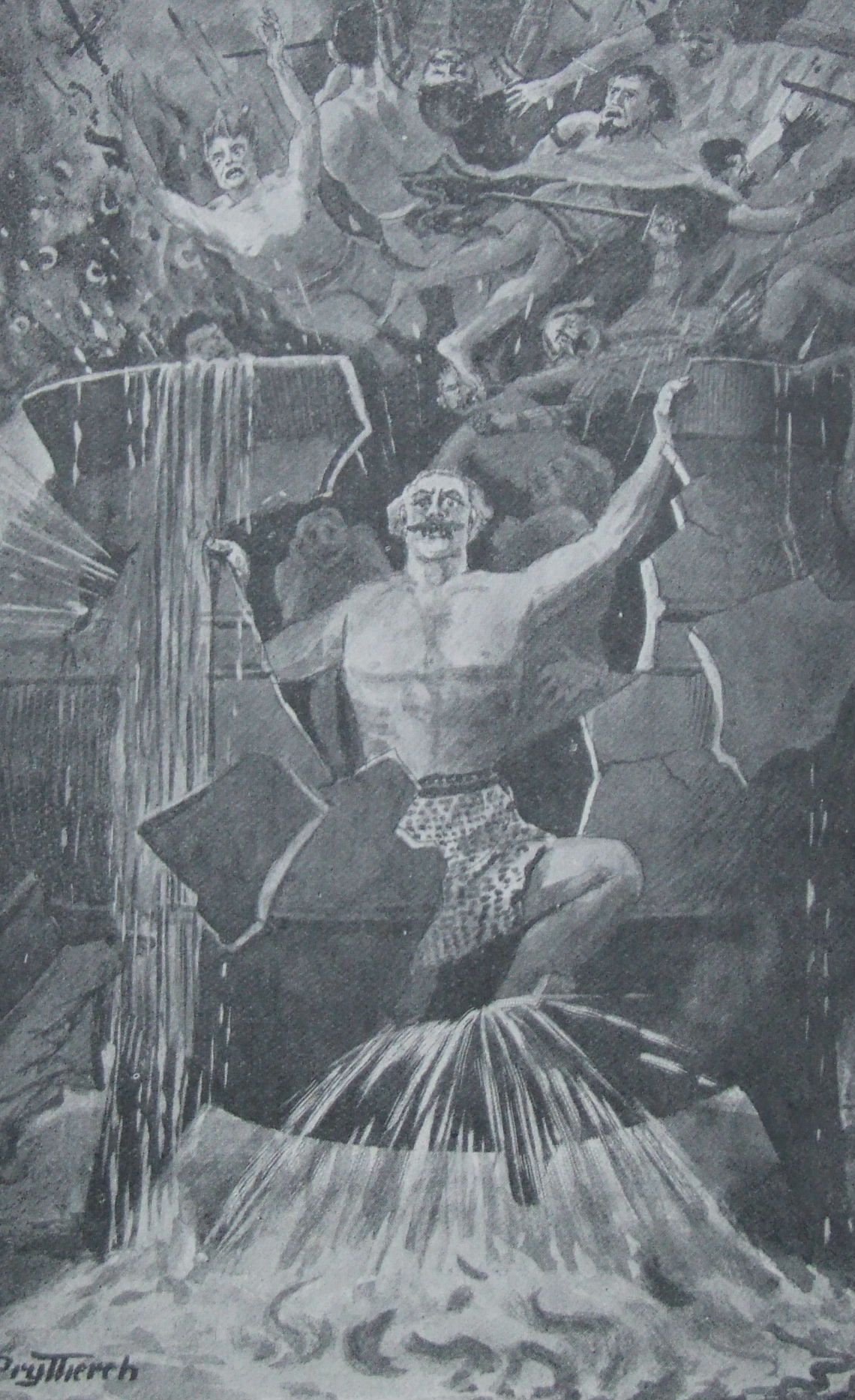
The Destruction of the Cauldron of Rebirth, by T. Prytherch

In Welsh mythology and literature, the Pair Dadeni (Cauldron of Rebirth) is a magical cauldron able to resurrect the dead. It plays a key role in Branwen ferch Llŷr, the second branch of the Mabinogi. Pair Dadeni was destroyed by Efnysien in a battle with the Irish. Seeing that the Irish were using the cauldron to revive their dead, he hid among the Irish corpses and was thrown into the cauldron by the Irish. He destroyed the cauldron from within, sacrificing himself in the process.

The Pair Dadeni is one of a number of magic cauldrons in Welsh legend and folklore, including the cauldron of Diwrnach the Irishman in Culhwch and Olwen, the cauldron of the Head of Annwn in Preiddeu Annwfn, the cauldron of Cerridwen in the tale of Taliesin, and the cauldron of plenty of the Dagda.

In The Chronicles of Prydain by Lloyd Alexander, a cauldron similar to the Pair Dadeni exists to create undead warriors. Alexander cites Welsh mythology as a basis for Prydain and the cauldron in particular. A plan to destroy the cauldron forms much of the plot of the second book, The Black Cauldron.
