= Prydain =

Welsh term for the island of Britain

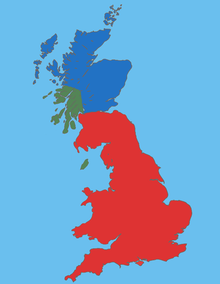
Great Britain and adjacent islands in the 5th century AD, before the invasion and subsequent founding of Anglo-Saxon kingdoms. Mainly (non-Pictish) Brittonic areas Mainly Pictish areas Mainly Goidelic areas

Prydain ([ˈprədai̯n], PRUH-dine; Middle Welsh: Prydein) is the modern Welsh name for Great Britain.

== Medieval ==
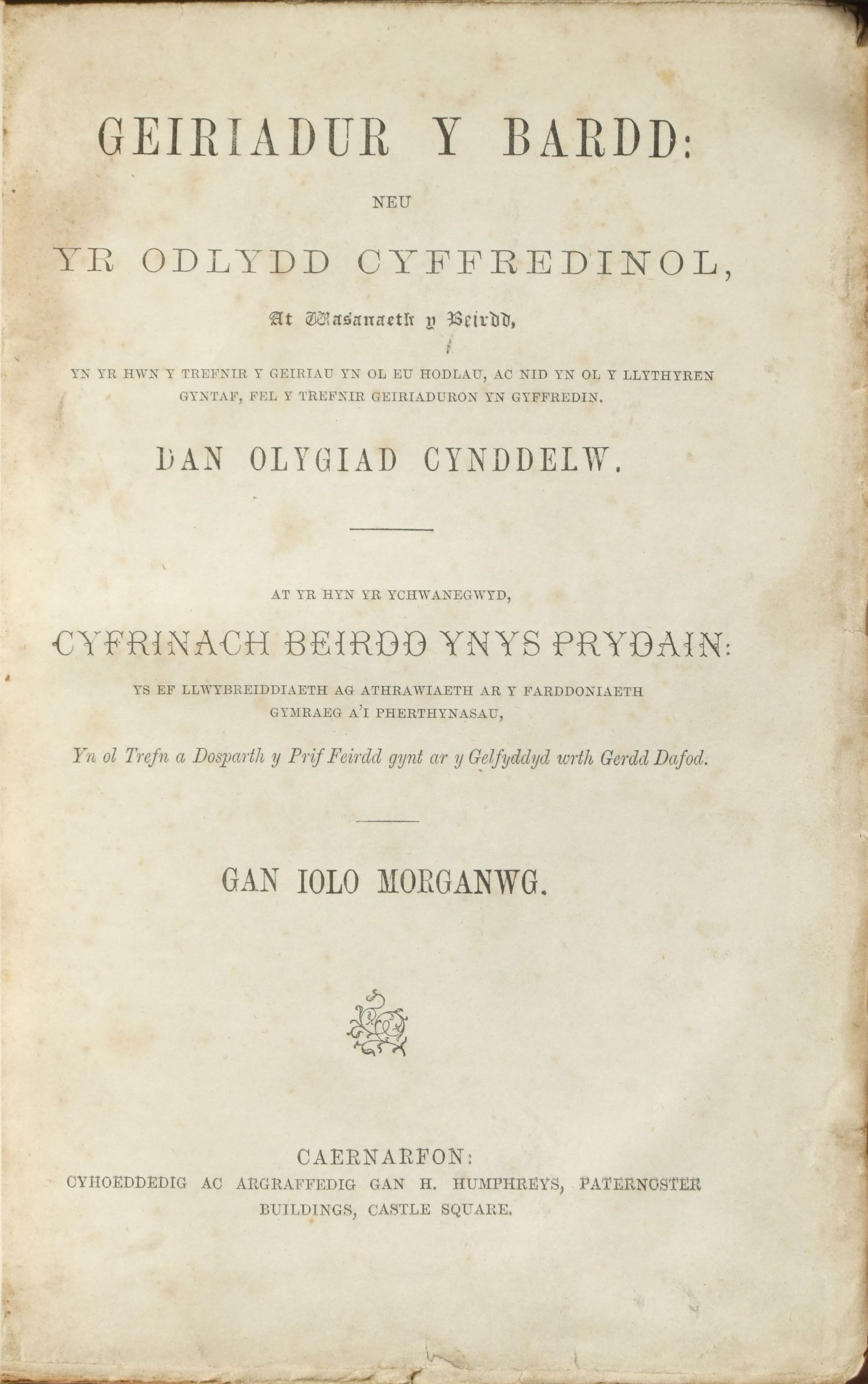
1870s book containing Cyfrinach Beirdd Ynys Prydain ("Mystery of the Bards of the Island of Britain", Iolo Morganwg)

Prydain is the medieval Welsh term for the island of Britain. The Latin name Albion was not used by the Welsh. More specifically, Prydain may refer to the Brittonic parts of the island; that is, the parts south of Caledonia. This distinction appears to derive from Roman times, when the island was divided into Roman Britain to the south and the land of the Caledonians to the North. The peoples north of the Roman borders eventually came to be known as the Picts (Welsh: Brithwyr); the Welsh term for Pictland was Prydyn, which caused some confusion in the texts with Prydain.

In Middle Welsh texts, the related term Ynys Prydein ('Island of Britain'), or Ynys Brydein, can also refer to the island (ynys) itself but more often is a name for the Brittonic territories south of Caledonia. It is in this context that the name of the collection of traditional material arranged in triads known as Trioedd Ynys Prydein should be understood. In modern Welsh ynys means 'island', but in Middle Welsh it can also mean 'land' or 'realm' (compare Latin insula).

There are numerous other instances of the term Prydain in medieval Welsh texts. One of the best known is found in the title of the 10th-century vaticinatory poem Armes Prydein ('The Prophecy of Britain').

== In popular culture ==
Prydain is also used by Lloyd Alexander as the name for the realm in which his fantasy book series The Chronicles of Prydain takes place.

== See also ==
- History of Wales
- Lloegyr
- Britain (place name)
- Trioedd Ynys Prydein
