= List of steepest roads and streets =

This article lists the sections or streets and roads with the steepest gradients in the world.

== Individual streets ==
- Ffordd Pen Llech in Harlech, Wales was previously thought to have the steepest city street in the world and was given the Guinness World Record with a gradient at 37.45%, however after an appeal made by Baldwin street residents, both streets were reassessed and despite Ffordd Pen Llech having a greater gradient, the world's steepest Street was reinstated to Baldwin street, Dunedin.
- Baldwin Street in Dunedin, New Zealand, may be the steepest residential street in the world; it reportedly averages 1:3.41 (16.33° or 29.3%) for 161 meters but its maximum is claimed to be 35% for an unknown distance.
- Canton Avenue in Pittsburgh is said to have a 37% grade; the length of that grade is unknown.
- Three streets in Los Angeles are steeper—28th Street in San Pedro at 33.3%, Eldred Street in Highland Park at 33%, and Baxter Street in Silver Lake at 32%.
- Waipio Valley Road on the island of Hawai'i is said to be the steepest rural road in the United States, with some grades approaching 45%. It has been closed to non-local traffic.
- An Unnamed road in San Isidro de El General, Costa Rica, is claimed to have a 40% to 44% grade, although this has yet to be fully verified.

== Locations ==
- San Francisco, California is known for having numerous steep streets:
  - Filbert Street between Hyde and Leavenworth has a maximum gradient of 31.5% (17.5°). The city map shows a descent of 65 feet, which based on a half-block being 206.25 horizontal feet makes the grade 31.5%, the official figure.
  - 22nd Street shares the same 31.5% (17.5°) maximum gradient, between Vicksburg and Church Street, also one-way down.
  - The sidewalk-only section of Broderick Street (between Broadway and Vallejo), where the city map shows a climb of 96 feet in the 275-foot block) is steeper than Filbert in San Francisco, just under 35% grade.
  - The sidewalk-only block of Baker Street, just one block west of Broderick, also between Broadway and Vallejo is a bit steeper than Broderick.
  - An unofficial survey of San Francisco streets declared the steepest street in San Francisco to be a 30-foot section of Bradford Street, paved in 2010, with a 40% grade.
  - The curvy Lombard Street started as a 27% grade.
- The cities of Houghton and Hancock in Michigan, US, have been noted for their steep streets.
