= Grade (slope) =

Angle to the horizontal plane

d = run Δh = rise l = slope length α = angle of inclination

The grade (US) or gradient (UK) (also called slope, incline, mainfall, pitch or rise) of a physical feature, landform or constructed line is either the elevation angle of that surface to the horizontal or its tangent. It is a special case of the slope, where zero indicates horizontality. A larger number indicates higher or steeper degree of "tilt". Often slope is calculated as a ratio of "rise" to "run", or as a fraction ("rise over run") in which run is the horizontal distance (not the distance along the slope) and rise is the vertical distance.

Slopes of existing physical features such as canyons and hillsides, stream and river banks, and beds are often described as grades, but typically the word "grade" is used for human-made surfaces such as roads, landscape grading, roof pitches, railroads, aqueducts, and pedestrian or bicycle routes. The grade may refer to the longitudinal slope or the perpendicular cross slope.

== Nomenclature ==
Illustration of grades (percentages), angles in degrees, and ratio

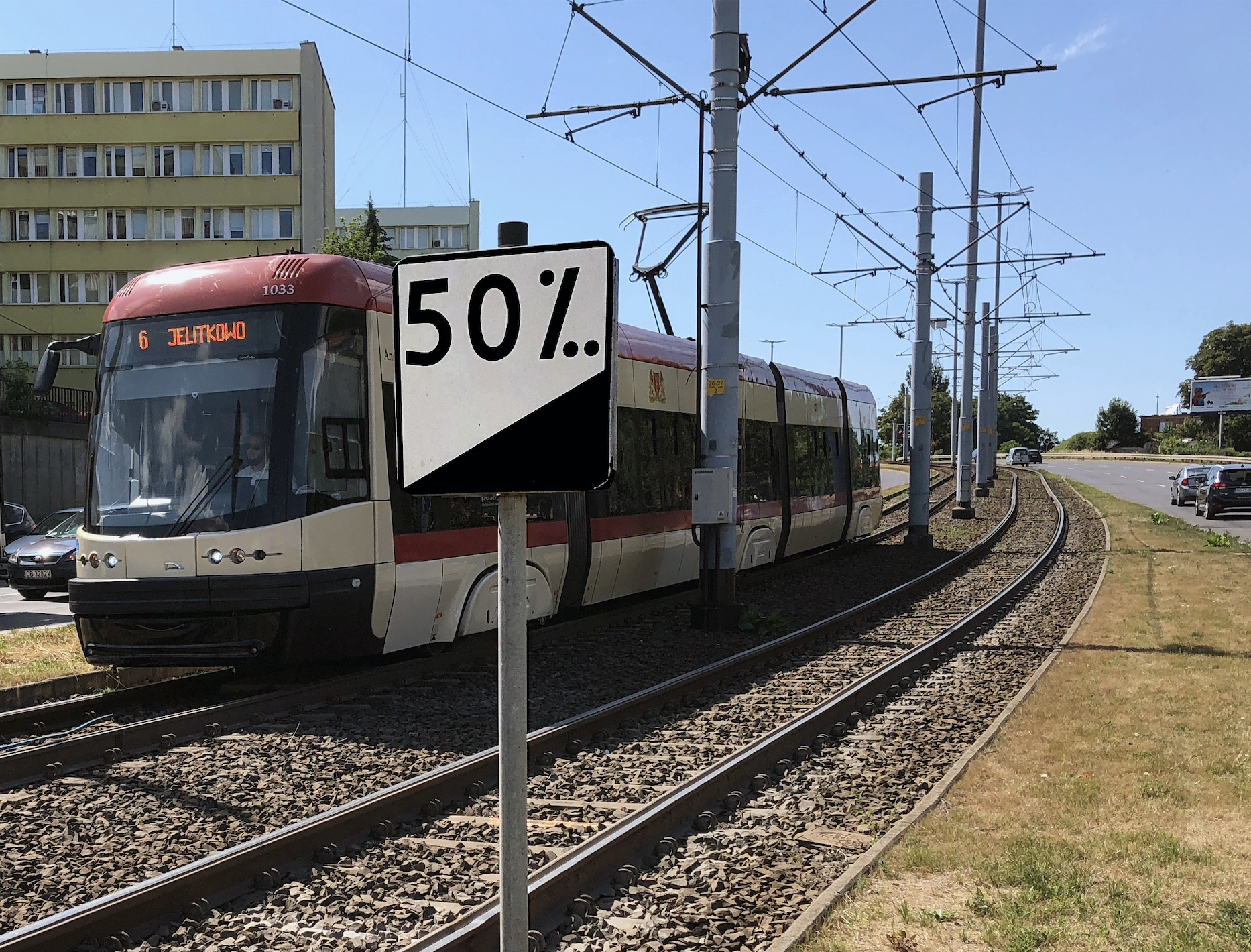
A tram and gradient sign in Gdańsk, Poland, indicating a 50‰ slope (50 m/km, 5%).

There are several ways to express slope:

1. as an angle of inclination to the horizontal. (This is the angle α opposite the "rise" side of a triangle with a right angle between vertical rise and horizontal run.)
2. as a percentage, the formula for which is $100 \times \frac{\text{rise}}{\text{run}}$, which is equivalent to the tangent of the angle of inclination times 100. At a slope angle of 45 degrees, the run is equal to the rise. Expressed as a percentage, the slope of this angle is 100 percent. As the slope approaches 90 degrees (vertical), the percentage slope approaches infinity. In Europe and the U.S. percentage grade is the most commonly used figure for describing slopes.
3. as a ‰ figure (denoted with the symbol ‰), the formula for which is $1000 \times \frac{\text{rise}}{\text{run}}$, which could also be expressed as the tangent of the angle of inclination times 1000. This is commonly used in Europe to denote the incline of a railway. It is sometimes written using mm/m or m/km instead of the ‰ symbol.
4. as a ratio of one part rise to so many parts run. For example, a slope that has a rise of 5 feet for every 1000 feet of run would have a slope ratio of 1 in 200. (The word in is normally used rather than the mathematical ratio notation of e.g. 1:200.) This is generally the method used to describe railway grades in Australia and the UK. It is used for roads in Hong Kong, and was used for roads in the UK until the 1970s.
5. as a ratio of many parts run to one part rise, which is the inverse of the previous expression (depending on the country and the industry standards). For example, a slope expressed as 4:1 in this system means for a given vertical distance the horizontal distance travelled is four times as long. (Note: The ratio of run/rise is used by civil engineers to measure the steepness of faces of dams and retaining walls, where it is called the inclination. In that context, fractional inclinations such as 1.3 or 0.8 are common.)

Any of these may be used. When the term grade is used, the slope is usually expressed as a percentage. If one looks at red numbers on the chart specifying grade, one can see the quirkiness of using the grade to specify slope; the numbers go from 0 for flat, to 100% at 45 degrees, to infinity at vertical.

Slope may still be expressed when the horizontal run is not known: the rise can be divided by the hypotenuse (the slope length). This is not the usual way to specify slope; this nonstandard expression follows the sine function rather than the tangent function, so it calls a 45 degree slope a 71 percent grade instead of a 100 percent. But in practice the usual way to calculate slope is to measure the distance along the slope and the vertical rise, and calculate the horizontal run from that, in order to calculate the grade (100% × rise/run) or standard slope (rise/run). When the angle of inclination is small, using the slope length rather than the horizontal displacement (i.e., using the sine of the angle rather than the tangent) makes only an insignificant difference and can then be used as an approximation. Railway gradients are often expressed in terms of the rise in relation to the distance along the track as a practical measure. In cases where the difference between sin and tan is significant, the tangent is used. In either case, the following identity holds for all inclinations up to 90 degrees: $\tan{\alpha} = \frac{\sin{\alpha}}{\sqrt{1-\sin^2{\alpha}}}$. Or more simply, one can calculate the horizontal run by using the Pythagorean theorem, after which it is trivial to calculate the (standard math) slope or the grade (percentage).

In Europe, road gradients are expressed in signage as percentage.

=== Equations ===
Grades are related using the following equations with symbols from the figure at top.

==== Tangent as a ratio ====
$$\tan{\alpha} = \frac{\Delta h}{d}$$

The slope expressed as a percentage can similarly be determined from the tangent of the angle:
$$\%\,\text{slope} = 100 \tan{\alpha}$$

==== Angle from a tangent gradient ====
$$\alpha = \arctan{\frac{\Delta h}{d}}$$

If the tangent is expressed as a percentage, the angle can be determined as:
$$\alpha = \arctan{\frac{\%\,\text{slope}}{100}}$$

If the angle is expressed as a ratio (1 in n) then:
$$\alpha = \arctan{\frac{1}{n}}$$

=== Example slopes comparing the notations ===
For degrees, percentage (%) and per-mille (‰) notations, larger numbers are steeper slopes. For ratios, larger numbers n of 1 in n are shallower, easier slopes.

The examples show round numbers in one or more of the notations and some documented and reasonably well known instances.

Examples of slopes in the various notations
Degrees	Percentage (%)	Permillage (‰)	Ratio	Remarks
60°	173%	1732‰	1 in 0.58	
47.7°	110%	1100‰	1 in 0.91	Stoosbahn (funicular railway)
45°	100%	1000‰	1 in 1	
35°	70%	700‰	1 in 1.428	
30.1°	58%	580‰	1 in 1.724	Lynton and Lynmouth Cliff Railway (funicular railway)
30°	58%	577‰	1 in 1.73	
25.5°	47%	476‰	1 in 2.1	Pilatus Railway (steepest rack railway)
20.3°	37%	370‰	1 in 2.70	Mount Washington Cog Railway (maximum grade)
20°	36%	363‰	1 in 2.75	
18.4°	33%	333‰	1 in 3	
16.9°	30%	300‰	1 in 3.3	Extremely steep road 30% warning (France)
14.0°	25%	250‰	1 in 4	Very steep road. Mount Washington Cog Railway (average grade) 25% warning (Wales)
11.3°	20%	200‰	1 in 5	Steep road 20% warning (North Yorkshire)
8.13°	14.2%	142‰	1 in 7	
7.12°	12.5%	125‰	1 in 8	Cable incline on the Cromford and High Peak Railway
5.71°	10%	100‰	1 in 10	Steep road 10% warning (Netherlands)
4.0°	7%	70‰	1 in 14.3	
3.83°	6.7%	67‰	1 in 15	Usui Pass
3.37°	5.9%	59‰	1 in 17	Swannington incline on the Leicester and Swannington Railway
2.86°	5%	50‰	1 in 20	Matheran Hill Railway. The incline from the Crawlerway at the Kennedy Space Center to the launch pads.
2.29°	4%	40‰	1 in 25	Cologne–Frankfurt high-speed rail line
2.0°	3.5%	35‰	1 in 28.57	LGV Sud-Est, LGV Est, LGV Méditerranée
1.97°	3.4%	34‰	1 in 29	Bagworth incline on the Leicester and Swannington Railway
1.89°	3.3%	33‰	1 in 30.3	Rampe de Capvern on the Toulouse–Bayonne railway
1.52°	2.65%	26.5‰	1 in 37.7	Lickey Incline
1.43°	2.5%	25‰	1 in 40	LGV Atlantique, LGV Nord. The Schiefe Ebene.
1.146°	2%	20‰	1 in 50	Railway near Jílové u Prahy. Devonshire Tunnel 20‰ Czech Republic
0.819°	1.43%	14.3‰	1 in 70	Waverley Route
0.716°	1.25%	12.5‰	1 in 80	Ruling grade of a secondary main line. Wellington Bank, Somerset
0.637°	1.11%	11.11‰	1 in 90	Dove Holes Tunnel
0.573°	1%	10‰	1 in 100	The long drag on the Settle & Carlisle line
0.458°	0.8%	8‰	1 in 125	Rampe de Guillerval
0.2865°	0.5%	5‰	1 in 200	Paris–Bordeaux railway, except for the rampe de Guillerval
0.1719°	0.3%	3‰	1 in 333	
0.1146°	0.2%	2‰	1 in 500	
0.0868°	0.1515%	1.515‰	1 in 660	Brunel's Billiard Table – Didcot to Swindon
0.0434°	0.07575%	0.7575‰	1 in 1320	Brunel's Billiard Table – Paddington to Didcot
0°	0%	0‰	1 in ∞ (infinity)	Flat

== Roads ==
In vehicular engineering, various land-based designs (automobiles, sport utility vehicles, trucks, trains, etc.) are rated for their ability to ascend terrain. Trains typically rate much lower than automobiles. The highest grade a vehicle can ascend while maintaining a particular speed is sometimes termed that vehicle's "gradeability" (or, less often, "grade ability"). The lateral slopes of a highway geometry are sometimes called fills or cuts where these techniques have been used to create them.

In the United States, the maximum grade for federally funded highways is specified in a design table based on terrain and design speeds, with up to 6% generally allowed in mountainous areas and hilly urban areas with exceptions for up to 7% grades on mountainous roads with speed limits below 60 mph (95 km/h).

The steepest roads in the world according to the Guinness Book of World Records are Baldwin Street in Dunedin, New Zealand, Ffordd Pen Llech in Harlech, Wales and Canton Avenue in Pittsburgh, Pennsylvania. The Guinness World Record once again lists Baldwin Street as the steepest street in the world, with a 34.8% grade (1 in 2.87) after a successful appeal against the ruling that handed the title, briefly, to Ffordd Pen Llech.

A number of streets elsewhere have steeper grades than those listed in the Guinness Book. Drawing on the U.S. National Elevation Dataset, 7x7 (magazine) identified ten blocks of public streets in San Francisco open to vehicular traffic in the city with grades over 30 percent. The steepest, at 41 percent, is the block of Bradford Street above Tompkins Avenue in the Bernal Heights neighborhood. The San Francisco Municipal Railway operates bus service among the city's hills. The steepest grade for bus operations is 23.1% by the 67 Bernal Heights on Alabama Street between Ripley and Esmeralda Streets.

Likewise, the Pittsburgh Department of Engineering and Construction recorded a grade of 37% (20°) for Canton Avenue. The street has formed part of a bicycle race since 1983.

10% slope warning sign, Netherlands

7% descent warning sign, Finland

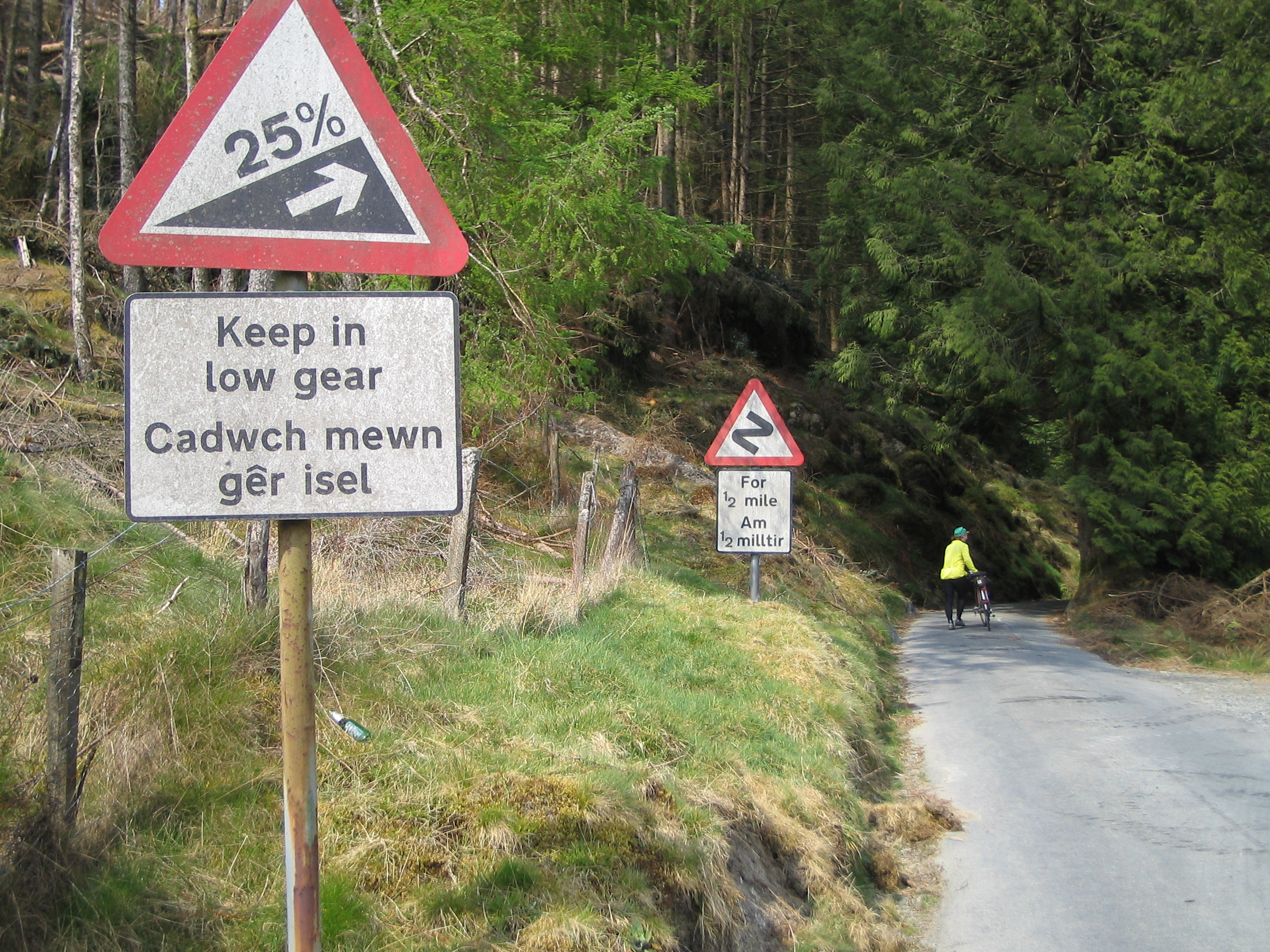
25% ascent warning sign, Wales

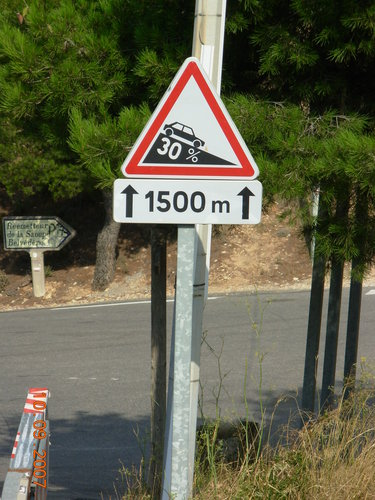
30% descent warning sign, over 1500 m. La Route des Crêtes, Cassis, France

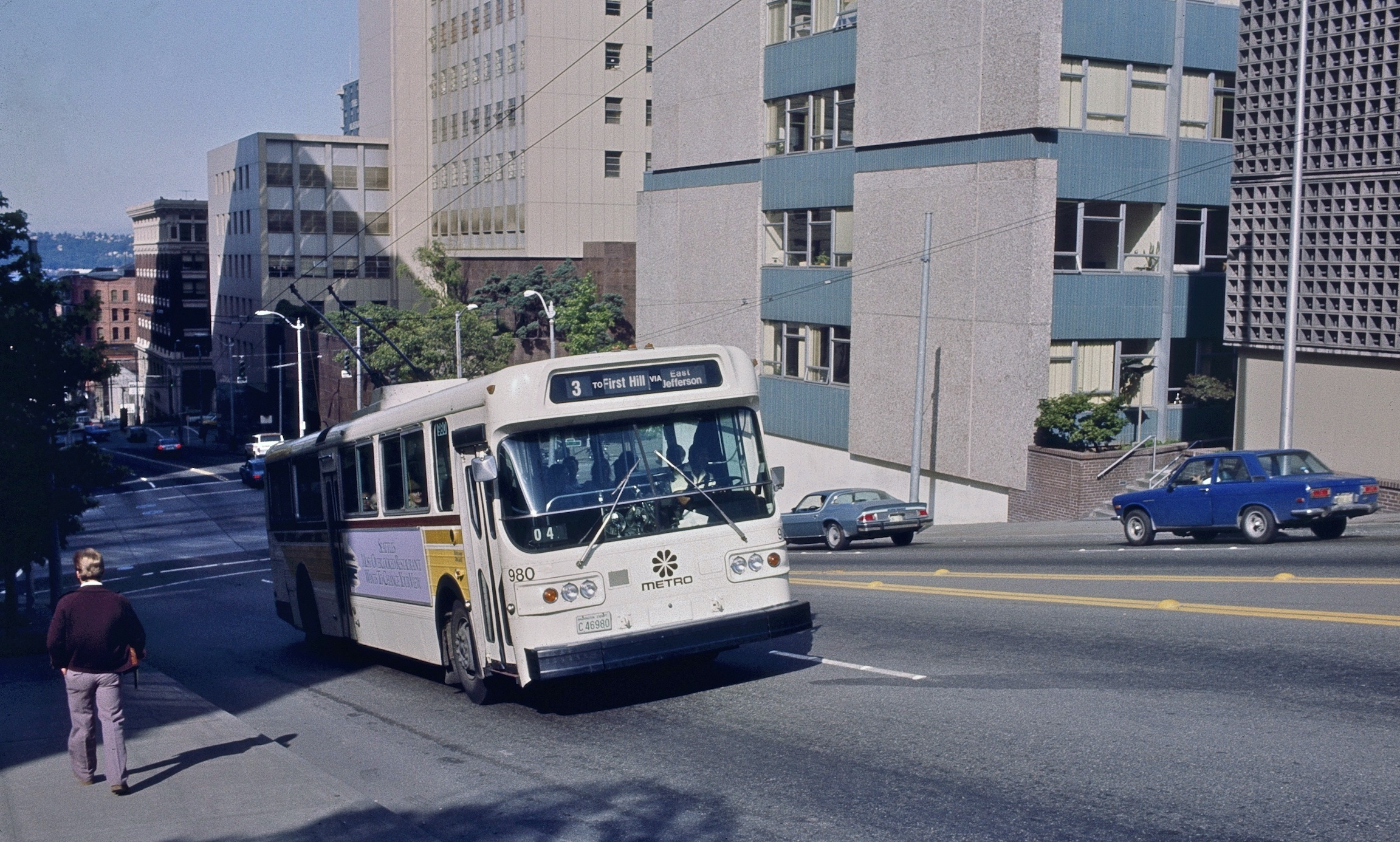
A trolleybus climbing an 18% grade in Seattle

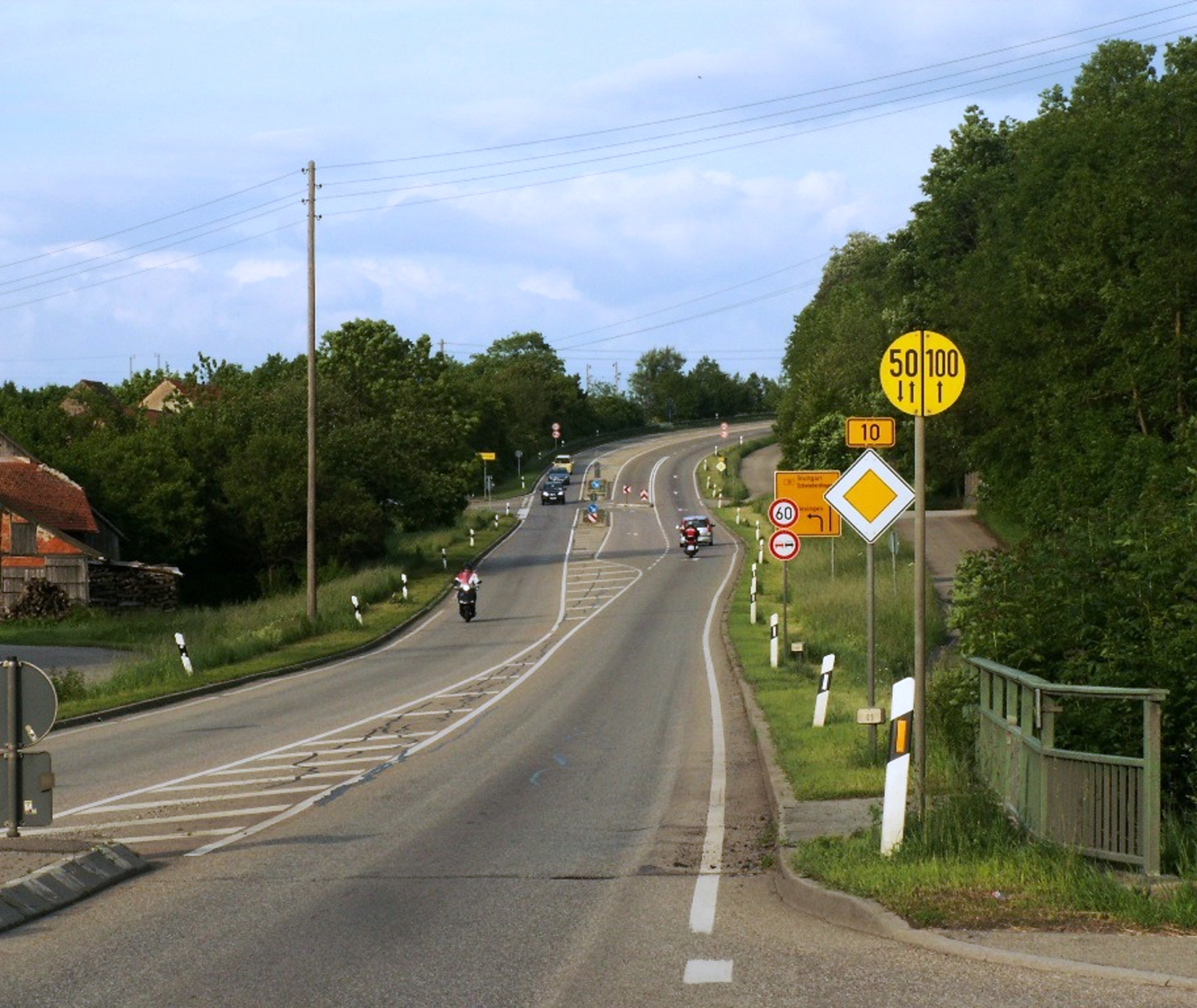
Ascent of German Bundesstraße 10

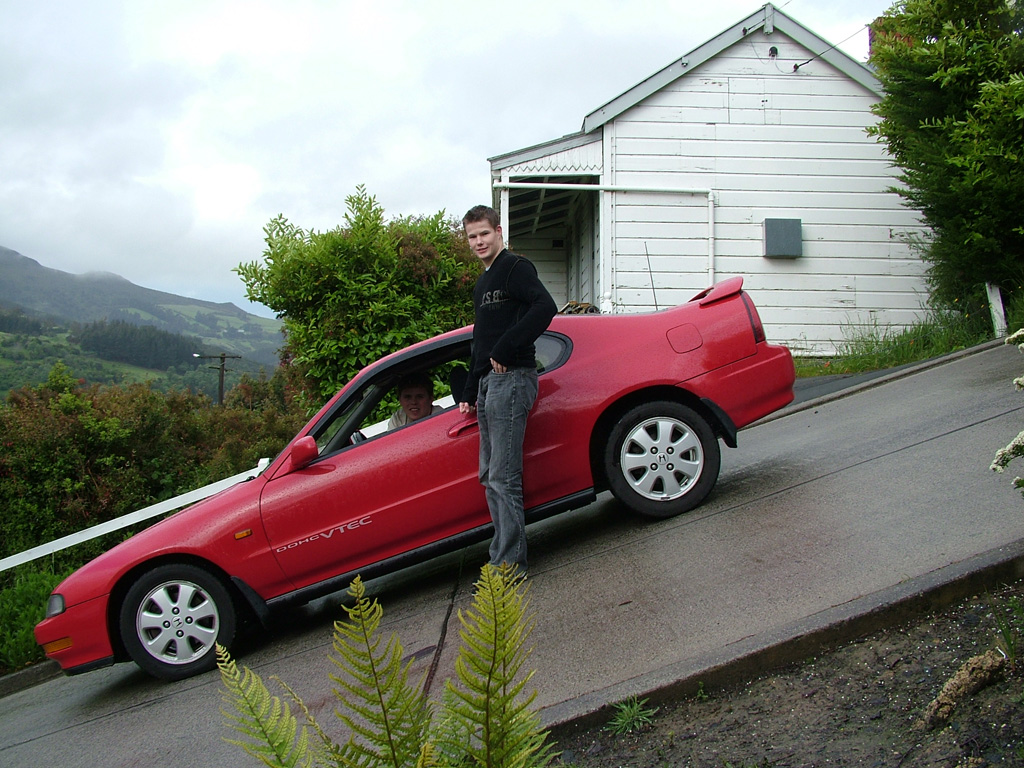
A car standing on Baldwin Street, Dunedin, New Zealand

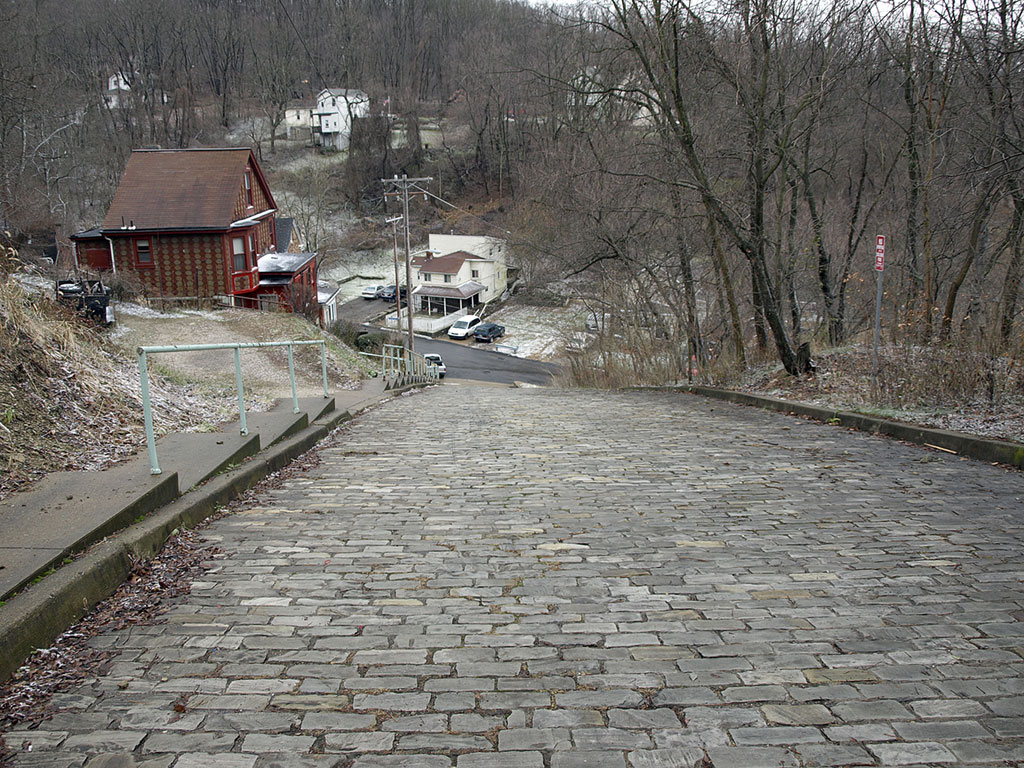
Looking down Canton Avenue, Pittsburgh, Pennsylvania

== Environmental design ==
Grade, pitch, and slope are important components in landscape design, garden design, landscape architecture, and architecture for engineering and aesthetic design factors. Drainage, slope stability, circulation of people and vehicles, complying with building codes, and design integration are all aspects of slope considerations in environmental design.

== Railways ==
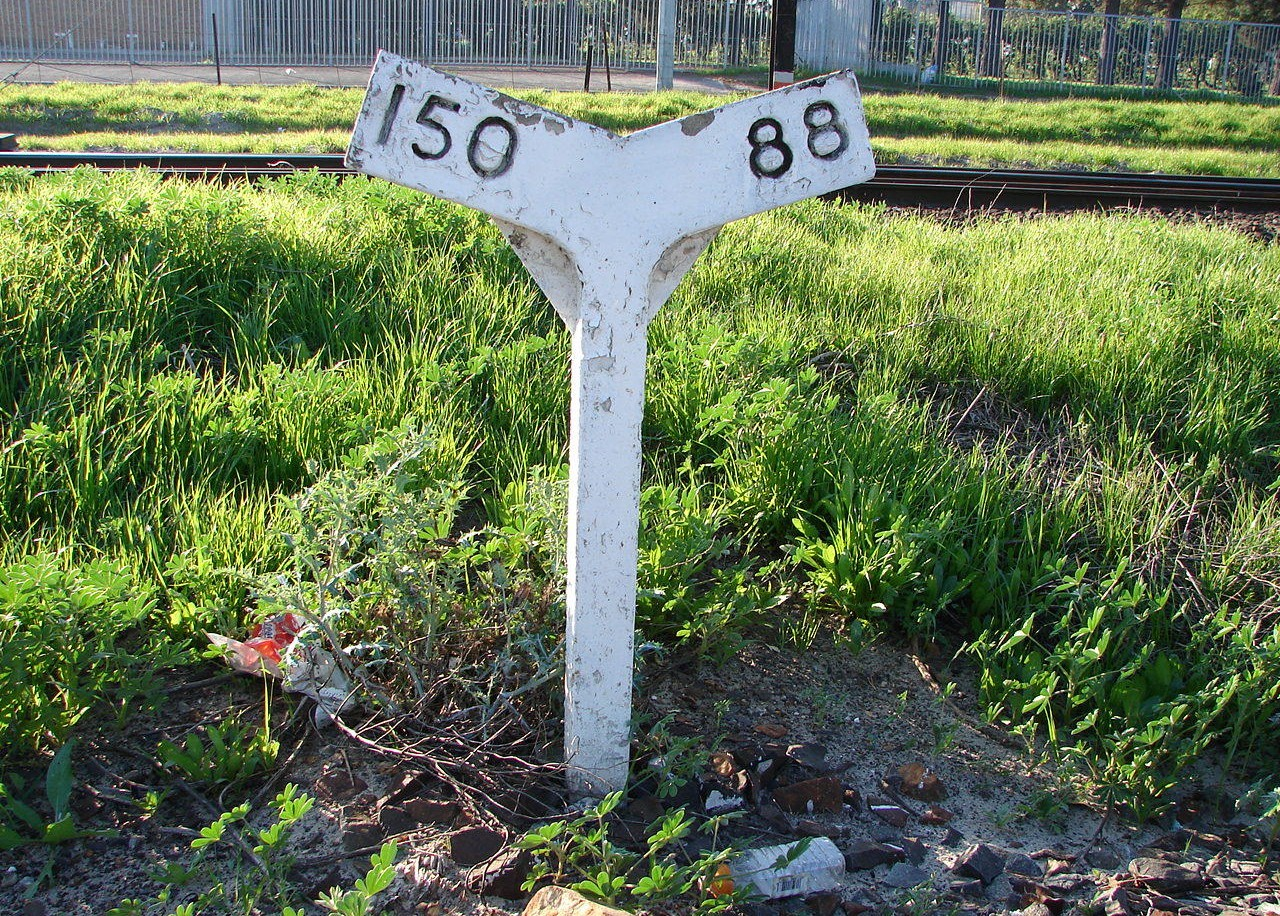
Grade indicator near Bellville, Western Cape, South Africa, showing 1:150 and 1:88 grades

Ruling gradients limit the load that a locomotive can haul, including the weight of the locomotive itself. Pulling a heavily loaded train at 20 km/h may require ten times the force climbing a 1% slope than on level track.

Early railways in the United Kingdom were laid out with very gentle gradients, such as 0.07575% (1 in 1320) and 0.1515% (1 in 660) on the Great Western main line, nicknamed Brunel's Billiard Table, because the early locomotives (and their brakes) were feeble. Steep gradients were concentrated in short sections of lines where it was convenient to employ assistant engines or cable haulage, such as the 1.2-kilometre (0.75-mile) section from Euston to Camden Town.

Extremely steep gradients require mechanical assistance. Cable systems are used in cases like the Scenic Railway at Katoomba Scenic World in Australia, which reaches a maximum grade of 122% (52°) and is claimed to be the world's steepest passenger-carrying funicular. For somewhat gentler inclines, rack railways are employed, such as the Pilatus Railway in Switzerland, which has a maximum grade of 48% (26°) and is considered the steepest rack railway.

Gradients can be expressed as an angle, as feet per mile, feet per chain, 1 in n, x% or y per mille. Since designers like round figures, the method of expression can affect the gradients selected.

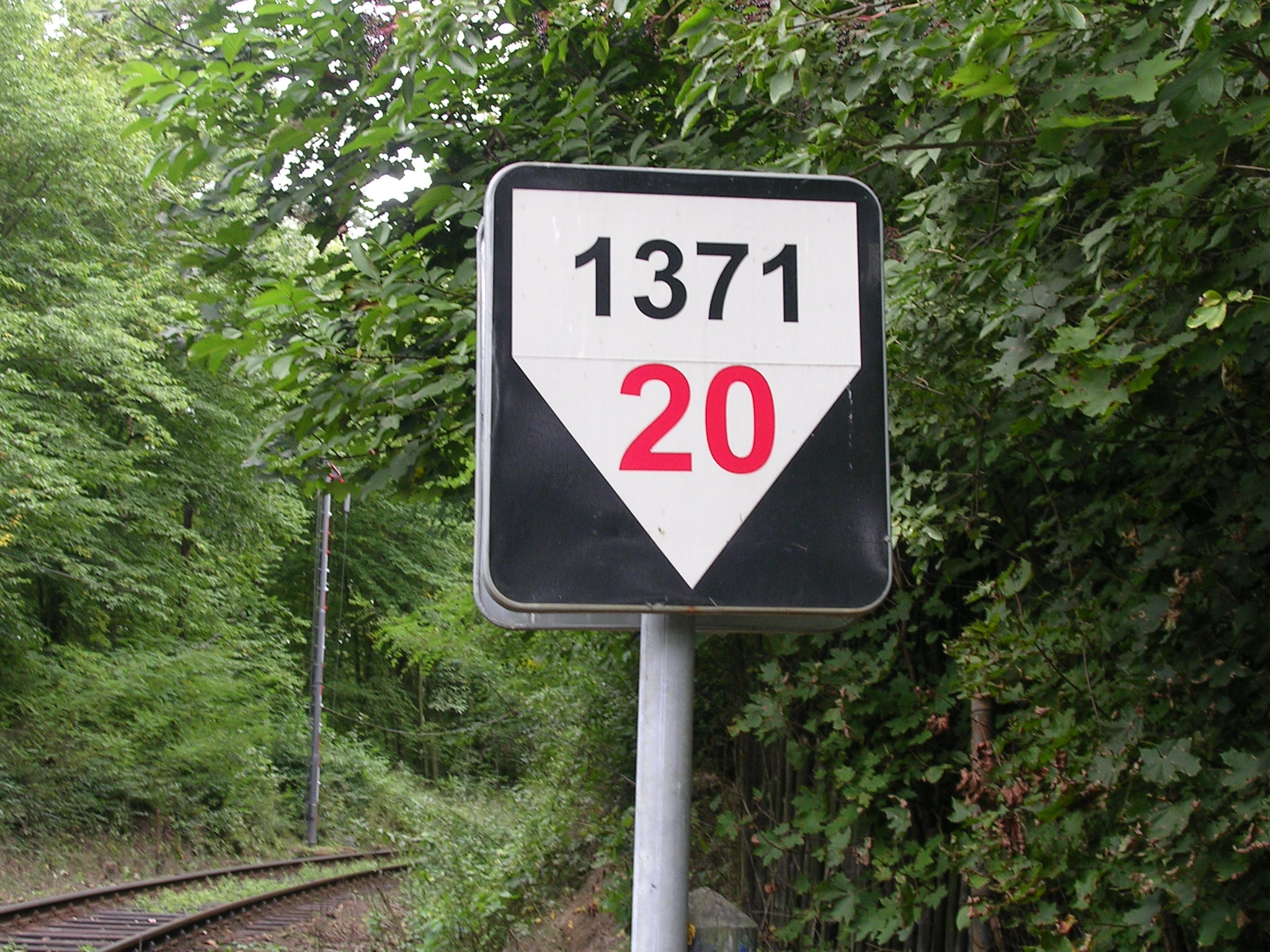
A 1371-metre-long stretch of railroad with a 20‰ (2%) slope, Czech Republic

The steepest railway lines that do not use rack systems include:

- 13.5% (1 in 7.40) – Lisbon tram, Portugal
- 11.6% (1 in 8.62) – Pöstlingbergbahn, Linz, Austria
- 11.0% (1 in 9.09) – Cass Scenic Railway, US (former logging line)
- 9.0% (1 in 11.11) – Ligne de Saint Gervais – Vallorcine, France
- 9.0% (1 in 11.11) – Muni Metro J Church, San Francisco, US
- 8.8% (1 in 11.4) – Iași tram, Romania
- 8.65% (1 in 11.95) – Portland Streetcar, Oregon, US
- 8.33%(1 in 12) – Nilgiri Mountain Railway Tamil Nadu, India
- 8.0% (1 in 12.5) – Just outside the Tombstone Jct. Station in the Tombstone Junction Theme Park, Kentucky, US. The railroad line there had a ruling grade of 6% (1 in 16.7).
- 7.85% (1 in 12.7) – Near Washington Street station on the Green Line B branch, Boston, Massachusetts, US.
- 7.1% (1 in 14.08) – Erzberg Railway, Austria
- 7.0% (1 in 14.28) – Bernina Railway, Switzerland
- 6.0% (1 in 16.7) – Arica, Chile to La Paz, Bolivia
- 6.0% (1 in 16.6) – Docklands Light Railway, London, UK
- 6.0% (1 in 16.6) – Ferrovia Centrale Umbra, Italy
- 6.0% (1 in 16.6) – Link light rail, Seattle, U.S.
- 5.89% (1 in 16.97) – Madison, Indiana, US
- 5.6% (1 in 18) – Flåm Line, Norway
- 5.3% (1 in 19) – Foxfield Railway, Staffordshire, UK
- 5.1% (1 in 19.6) – Saluda Grade, North Carolina, US
- 5.0% (1 in 20) – Khyber Pass Railway, Pakistan
- 4.5% (1 in 22.2) – The Canadian Pacific Railway's Big Hill, British Columbia, Canada (prior to the construction of the Spiral Tunnels)
- 4.3% (1 in 23) – Colwall Old Tunnel, Malvern Hills, UK
- 4.0% (1 in 25) – Cologne-Frankfurt high-speed rail line, Germany
- 4.0% (1 in 25) – Bolan Pass Railway, Pakistan
- 4.0% (1 in 25) – (211.2 feet (64 m) per 1 mile (1,600 m) ) – Tarana – Oberon branch, New South Wales, Australia.
- 4.0% (1 in 25) – Matheran Light Railway, India
- 4.0% (1 in 26) – Rewanui Incline, New Zealand. Fitted with Fell center rail but was not used for motive power, but only braking
- 3.6% (1 in 27) – Ecclesbourne Valley Railway, Heritage Line, Wirksworth, Derbyshire, UK
- 3.6% (1 in 28) – The Westmere Bank, New Zealand has a ruling gradient of 1 in 35, however peaks at 1 in 28
- 3.33% (1 in 30) – Umgeni Steam Railway, South Africa
- 3.0% (1 in 33) – several sections of the Main Western line between Valley Heights and Katoomba in the Blue Mountains Australia.
- 3.0% (1 in 33) – The entire Newmarket Line in central Auckland, New Zealand
- 3.0% (1 in 33) – Otira Tunnel, New Zealand, which is equipped with extraction fans to reduce chance of overheating and low visibility
- 3.0% (1 in 33) – The approaches to the George L. Anderson Memorial Bridge crossing the Neponset River, Boston, Massachusetts, US. The Ruling Gradient of the Braintree Branch of the Red Line (MBTA).
- 2.7% (1 in 37) – Braganza Ghats, Bhor Ghat and Thull ghat sections in Indian Railways, India
- 2.7% (1 in 37) – Exeter Central to Exeter St Davids, UK (see Exeter Central railway station#Description)
- 2.7% (1 in 37) – Picton- Elevation, New Zealand
- 2.65% (1 in 37.7) – Lickey Incline, UK
- 2.6% (1 in 38) – A slope near Halden on Østfold Line, Norway – Ok for passenger multiple units, but an obstacle for freight trains which must keep their weight down on this international mainline because of the slope. Freight traffic has mainly shifted to road.
- 2.3% (1 in 43.5) – Schiefe Ebene, Germany
- 2.2% (1 in 45.5) – The Canadian Pacific Railway's Big Hill, British Columbia, Canada (after the construction of the Spiral Tunnels)
- 2.0% (1 in 48) – Beasdale Bank (West Coast Scotland mainline), UK
- 2.0% (1 in 50) – Numerous locations on New Zealand's railway network, New Zealand
- 1.66% (1 in 60) – Section of track on the Dublin-Cork line between mile posts 164 and 162.
- 1.51% (1 in 66) – (1 foot (0.3 m) per 1 chain (20 m)) New South Wales Government Railways, Australia, part of Main South line.
- 1.25% (1 in 80) – Wellington Bank, Somerset, UK
- 1.25% (1 in 80) – Rudgwick, UK (West Sussex) platform before regrading – too steep if a train is not provided with continuous brakes.
- 0.77% (1 in 130) – Rudgwick, UK platform after regrading – not too steep if a train is not provided with continuous brakes.

=== Compensation for curvature ===
Gradients on sharp curves are effectively a bit steeper than the same gradient on straight track, so to compensate for this and make the ruling grade uniform throughout, the gradient on those sharp curves should be reduced slightly.

=== Continuous brakes ===
In the era before they were provided with continuous brakes, whether air brakes or vacuum brakes, steep gradients made it extremely difficult for trains to stop safely. In those days, for example, an inspector insisted that Rudgwick railway station in West Sussex be regraded. He would not allow it to open until the gradient through the platform was eased from 1 in 80 to 1 in 130.

== See also ==
- Angle of repose
- Aspect (geography)
- Civil engineering
- Construction surveying
- Grading (engineering)
- Cut-and-cover
- Cut (earthmoving)
- Cut and fill
- Embankment (transportation)
- Grade separation
- Inclined plane
- List of steepest gradients on adhesion railways
- Per mille
- Percentage
- Rake
- Roof pitch
- Ruling gradient
- Slope stability
- Slope
  - Slope stability analysis
- Stream slope
- Strike and dip
- Surface gradient
- Surveying
- Trench
- Tunnel
- Wheelchair ramp
