= Elysian Heights, Los Angeles =

Neighborhood in Los Angeles

Elysian Heights
- Neighborhood of Los Angeles
- Location within Los Angeles
- Coordinates: 34°05′30″N 118°14′56″W
- Country: United States of America
- State: California
- County: Los Angeles
- Time zone: Pacific
- Zip Code: 90026, 90039
- Area code: 323

Elysian Heights is a neighborhood in Los Angeles, California. It is known for its history as a prominent hub of counterculture and progressivism, popularity with artists and creatives, and steep streets.

== Geography ==
Located within Echo Park between Echo Park Lake and Elysian Park, Elysian Heights is bounded by the hills just north of Sunset Boulevard on the south, Glendale Boulevard on the west, Elysian Park on the east, and the 5 Freeway on the north.

== History ==
Elysian Heights started out as a summer getaway. The neighborhood has been home to many of the counter-culture, political radicals, artists, writers, architects and filmmakers in Los Angeles. The children of many progressives attended school there during the 1930s, 1940s and 1950s. By the 1930s, it was known as Red Hill, for the communists thought to live there.

In 2005, the Los Angeles chapter of the Sierra Club sponsored the "Elysian Heights Stairway Walk".

== Education ==
- Elysian Heights Elementary School - 1562 Baxter Avenue

== Historic-Cultural Monuments ==
The following Historic-Cultural Monuments are located in Elysian Heights:

- Ross House − 2123 N. Valentine Street. On September 23, 2009 it became Historic-Cultural Monument #964
- Atwater bungalows - 1401-1435 W. Avon Park Terrace. Designed by Robert Stacy-Judd, they became Historic-Cultural Monument #1217 in June 2021.
- Queen of Elysian Heights - 2004 N. Echo Park Boulevard. On November 9, 2022 it became Historic-Cultural Monument #1272

== Notable residents ==
- John Huston, film director and screenwriter
- Clara Kimball Young, silent film actress
- Carey McWilliams, journalist and editor
- Leo Politi, artist and author
- Room 8, school cat
- Elliott Smith, musician and singer-songwriter
