= Drift trike =

Type of tricycle

A 3D model of a drift trike

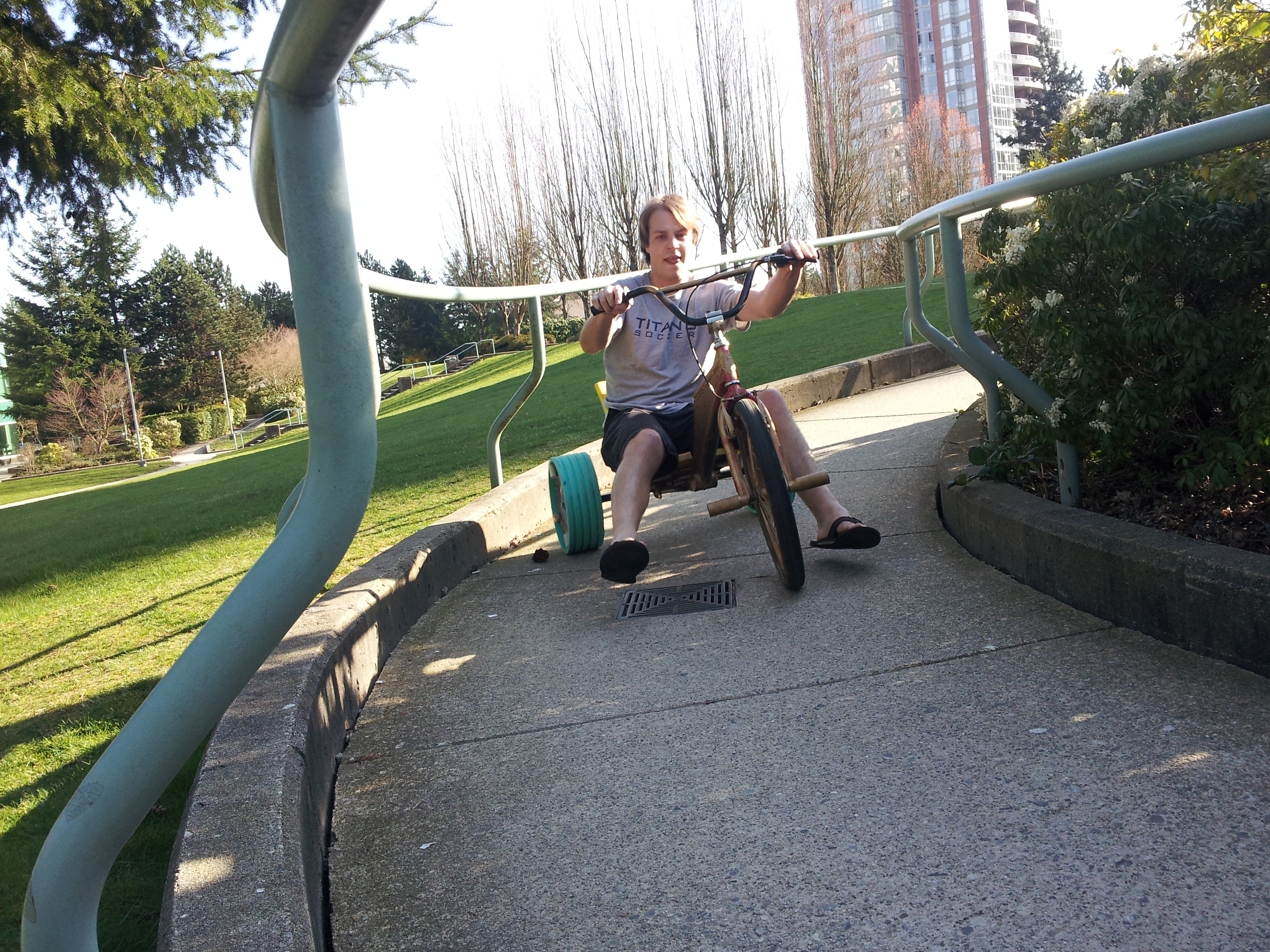
Example of a homemade drift trike

Drift trikes are tricycles with low-traction rear wheels made of hard plastic, usually PVC. They are designed for intentional drifting by initiating a loss of traction on the rear wheels and using counter-steering. Drift trikes are typically ridden on paved roads with steep grades and corners.

== History ==
Drift trikes originated in California in 1974 when Marty Spellman and his friends built the original drift trikes to race on the hills of Laguna Beach, Malibu, Fullerton, and other cities. From the original 8mm film footage and a Los Angeles Times report, the design of modern-day drift trikes remains similar to Spellman's creation. Spellman is widely recognized as the inventor of the drift trike by organizations in Australia, Argentina, Brazil (including Kamikaze Trikers and Guiguinotrike), Chile, Colombia, France (Fédération France de Drift Trike), Italy (Drift One), Mexico, Spain, and the United States.

Drift triking, or the act of riding a drift trike, has a dedicated, quickly growing following across the globe. The resurgence of drift triking began in New Zealand and is spreading to countries including Australia, the United States, Columbia, and various European nations.

The American Drift Trike Association, founded in 2011 to promote the sport, has since disbanded.

Drift triking has become the official motorsport in Latvia and is sponsored by brands like Red Bull, with groups like Drift Trikes Whangarei representing the sport's growing popularity and acceptance.

== Usage ==
Drift triking usually takes place on smooth, paved roads. Coarse, chipseal roads tend to wear rear wheels faster, create a rougher ride, and reduce drifting ability. Momentum is gained using gravity, and many riders use a freewheel to make their trike more versatile. The freewheel allows the rider to pedal and gain forward momentum while simultaneously allowing for coasting when not pedaling. Standing on the rear of the trike while kicking or pushing backward with one leg is another common method of gaining momentum.

Operating speeds for drift trikes usually range from 25–50 miles per hour (40–80 km/h). A speed of approximately 100 kilometres per hour (62 mph) was achieved in 2015 on the world's steepest street, Baldwin Street, in Dunedin, New Zealand.

== Design and manufacturers ==
The rear wheels of drift trikes are commonly made from PVC, or by sliding PVC or a polyethylene pipe over deflated pneumatic wheels and re-inflating them to lock them in place. Drift trikes also feature a solid, fixed beam, 'go-kart' style rear axle, which forces both rear wheels to spin at the same rate. The short wheelbase, or distance between the front and rear axles, allows riders to more easily initiate and maintain slides. Stability is provided by the large front wheel, low center of gravity, and steering system with a large degree of lock, allowing riders to slide without spinning.

Many drift trikes are homemade or custom-fabricated by professional welders. Commercially released children's versions have been released by bike manufacturers such as Drift Trike Factory, Huffy, Crane, Airwalk, and Triciclos de la Montaña. Local Motors was the first to introduce an electric, adult drift trike to the market.

BlackTop Engineering released the first adult's fuel-driven drift trike with a suspension system and "G-Force Bars". One of the biggest names in drift triking is Triad Drift Trikes from Australia, which has been manufacturing custom drift trikes since 2013.

Instead of choosing to buy brand-name drift trikes from manufacturers, many enthusiasts have chosen to design and build their own. Generally, this involves using an old kids' bike or BMX and modifying the frame to fit an axle and seat on the back. This allows people to give their trikes their unique look while being cost-effective.

=== Kiting drift trikes ===
Rather than gravity drift triking, some drift trikes use wind power from kites to move.

=== Motorized drift trikes ===
Fuel-driven drift trikes are gas-powered. With all the torque being applied to the rear wheels, it becomes much easier to drift at low speeds.

== Laws and regulations ==
Drift triking commonly falls within the jurisdiction of cyclist traffic laws. Many districts, regions, and countries require the use of helmets, brakes, a rear red reflector, and front lights. Some regions categorize them as "gravity" vehicles, where they are treated similarly to skateboards and street luges.
