= Morfa Harlech National Nature Reserve =

Nature reserve in Wales

Coordinates: 52.8896°N 4.1333°W

Morfa Harlech National Nature Reserve (grid reference SH571337) is a nature reserve in Wales, located north of Harlech.

The reserve reaches across expanses of open sand and sea towards Snowdonia and contains one of the two extensive sand dune systems which make up much of the sandy Meirionnydd coastline, it carries particular importance as the only growing dune system in Wales.

Morfa Harlech sand dunes is an extensive dune system stretching northwards from the town of Harlech. The dunes cover 6 km^{2}, of which an area of about 1.5 km^{2} in the middle has been afforested with Corsican Pine. Nearby is Harlech Castle, which due to the expanding dune system has been taken back 1,000 metres (3,300 ft) from its original position on the coastline 600 years ago. Morfa Harlech is one of Britain's actively growing sand dune systems due to the longshore drift which is currently eroding the dunes at Morfa Dyffryn.

== See also ==
- Dune
- Sand dune ecology
- Psammosere
