= Danny Chew =

American cyclist (born 1962)

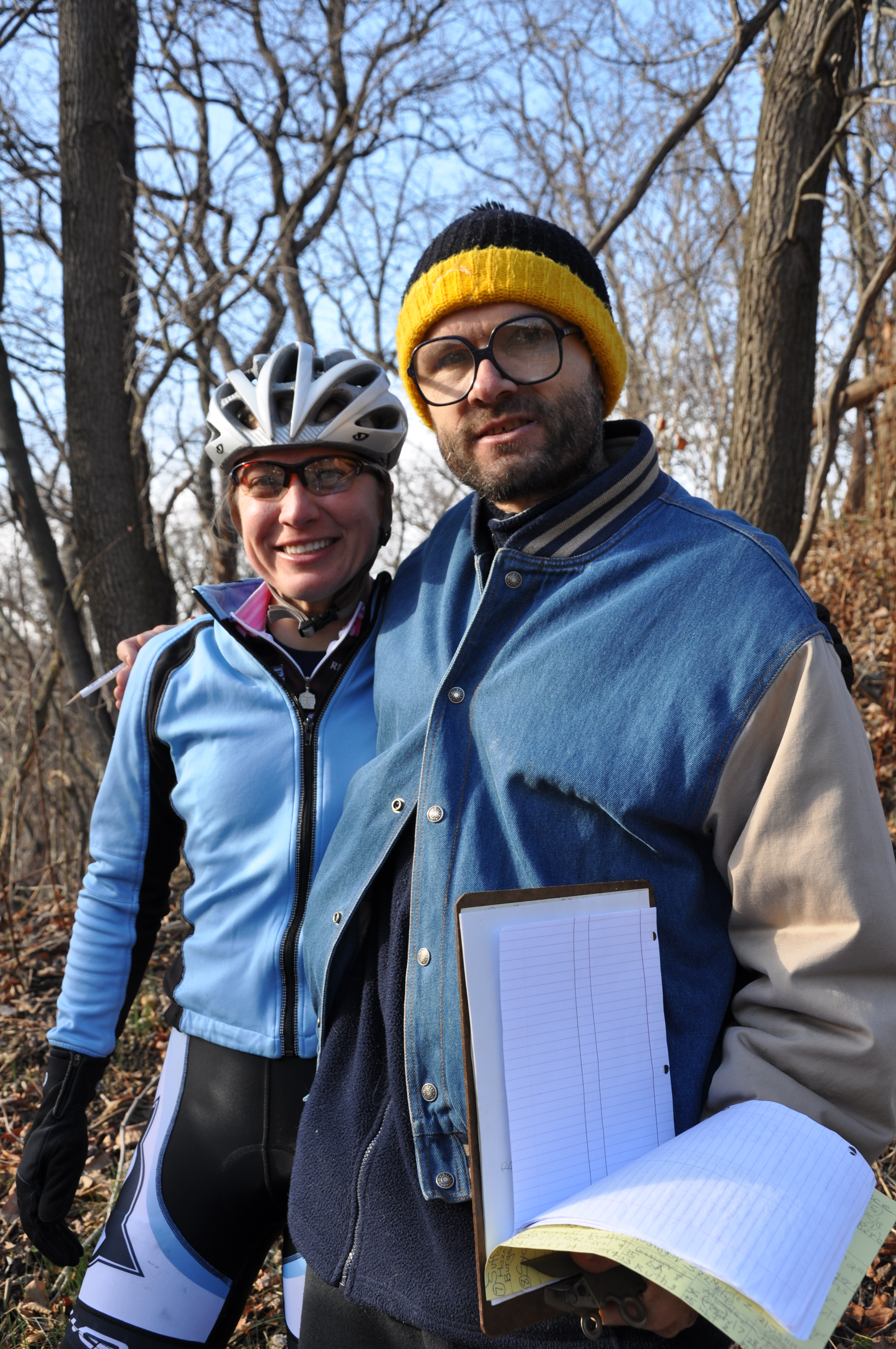

Personal information
- Full name: Daniel Paul Chew
- Nickname: The Million Mile Man
- Born: August 26, 1962 (age 64) Pittsburgh, United States
- Height: 6 ft 0 in (1.83 m)
- Weight: 175 lb (79 kg; 12.5 st)

Cycling career
- Sport: Cycling
- Disciplines: Road, Ultramarathon
- Role: Rider

Major wins
- Race Across America (1996, 1999)

Daniel Paul Chew (born August 26, 1962) is an American former professional road racing and ultramarathon cyclist who twice won the Race Across America. He is also co-founder and promoter of the Dirty Dozen, an annual road bicycle race over Pittsburgh's thirteen steepest hills. Chew is a 2014 inductee into the UltraCycling Hall of Fame.

== Early life and amateur career ==
Chew started cycling in 1971 at age 9, after being introduced to the sport by his older sister. His parents and older brother were also cyclists, and Chew began accompanying his family on recreational touring rides that year. He completed his first 200-mile event the following year in 1972, riding the Midwest Double Century in Lima, Ohio with his family.

== Professional career ==
Chew turned professional in 1985 and finished 12th in that year's national championship road race, the Corestates USPro in Philadelphia. He was 25th the following year, and 16th in 1987. Chew rode as an independent or free-agent professional without team support in all three appearances.

In 1994, Chew switched his competitive focus from traditional road cycling to ultra-distance cycling events. That year he placed 4th in his debut at the transcontinental Race Across America (RAAM). He was second at RAAM in 1995, and won the following year. He also won the 1999 RAAM, an experience he described as "tiredness beyond belief." Chew is an eight-time solo RAAM finisher.

== Personal life ==
On September 4, 2016, around noon, Chew was seriously injured when he had vertigo while riding and crashed into a drainage ditch on Kennard Road near Lodi, Ohio. He was initially diagnosed with a broken neck and possible paralysis. The following month, Dr. Elliot Roth of the Rehabilitation Institute of Chicago confirmed that Chew was permanently paralyzed from the chest down and would never walk again. Despite having contemplated suicide in the weeks immediately following his accident, Chew suggested during the final days of his hospital stay that he would resume his goal of riding one million lifetime miles, albeit aboard a handcycle.

Before his accident in 2016, Chew was diagnosed with Asperger syndrome. He earned a Bachelor of Science degree in mathematics from the University of Pittsburgh in 1987.

== Major results ==
1994
4th - Race Across America
1995
2nd - Race Across America
1996
1st - Race Across America
1997
2nd - Race Across America
1998
4th - Race Across America
1999
1st - Race Across America
2000
2nd - Race Across America
2001
3rd - Race Across America
