= Dirty Dozen (bicycle competition) =

Bicycle race in Pittsburgh, Pennsylvania, US

The Dirty Dozen
Race details
- Date: October/November
- Region: Western Pennsylvania, United States
- Discipline: Road race
- Type: One-day

History
- First edition: 1983
- Editions: 40 (as of 2023)
- First winner: Danny Chew (USA)
- Most wins: Steve Cummings (USA) 11 times
- Most recent: Laszlo Vasko (USA)

The Dirty Dozen is a one-day road cycling race in Pittsburgh, Pennsylvania, held annually on the Saturday before the Halloween holiday in October. The event is contested over a 50-mile (80 km) course that features 13 of the steepest hills in the Pittsburgh metropolitan area.

== History ==
The Dirty Dozen was founded in 1983 by brothers Tom and Danny Chew and their friend Bob Gottlieb, in an attempt to find and ride the steepest hills in Pittsburgh. Five riders participated in the first edition, though only three finished. The race has been held every year since 1983—except 1993 and 2020. In 1984, the Dirty Dozen was contested twice: once in January and once in October.

The 2016 edition of the race was the first in which co-founder and promoter Danny Chew did not participate. He broke his neck in a cycling crash in September 2016 and suffered permanent paralysis. Chew provided live commentary during the race via videolink, and the event itself served as a fundraiser for Chew's ongoing care and rehabilitation. Today, riders can expect to meet Chew as he oversees the race at selected locations throughout the ride.

For most of its history the race took place the Saturday after the Thanksgiving holiday in November, often under cold, wet, and especially “dirty” conditions. The race consisted of one, large group of riders (e.g., 328 riders in 2014), creating an extremely festive but chaotic atmosphere on many hills. Long waits in the cold for re-grouping at the top of hills challenged riders, and the race often finished at dusk. Nevertheless, because the riders are only racing uphill, the DD has always been an especially safe race, and open to any rider willing to take the challenge. Changes to the race format in recent years have made the race somewhat less “dirty,” but have maintained the camaraderie, challenge, and uniqueness the event is known for.

== Format ==
Competitors ride between hills at a neutral pace, and a whistle signals the rolling start of each hill. Standing starts are used, rarely, to accommodate road closures and safely enter hills. The top male and female riders on each hill score points, with the first place rider scoring 10 points and the tenth place receiving 1 point. The final standings are established by cumulative points throughout the event. Since 2016, the race has included multiple start waves based on riders’ anticipated pace, from the open competition wave departing first (where official scorers are used), to the “Party Bus” wave bringing up the rear. Women competing for official points must be in the Women's wave, although women also ride in other waves. In order to qualify as a finisher, riders must complete each hill in the event without losing forward progress or dismounting from the bicycle. If a rider fails to maintain forward progress, he or she must descend to the bottom of the hill and ride to the top under their own power. Hill # 9 (Canton Ave) often requires multiple attempts to complete, and in recent years, Hill #2 (Kendall) has also presented a difficulty for riders with slippery cobblestone sections.

== Route ==
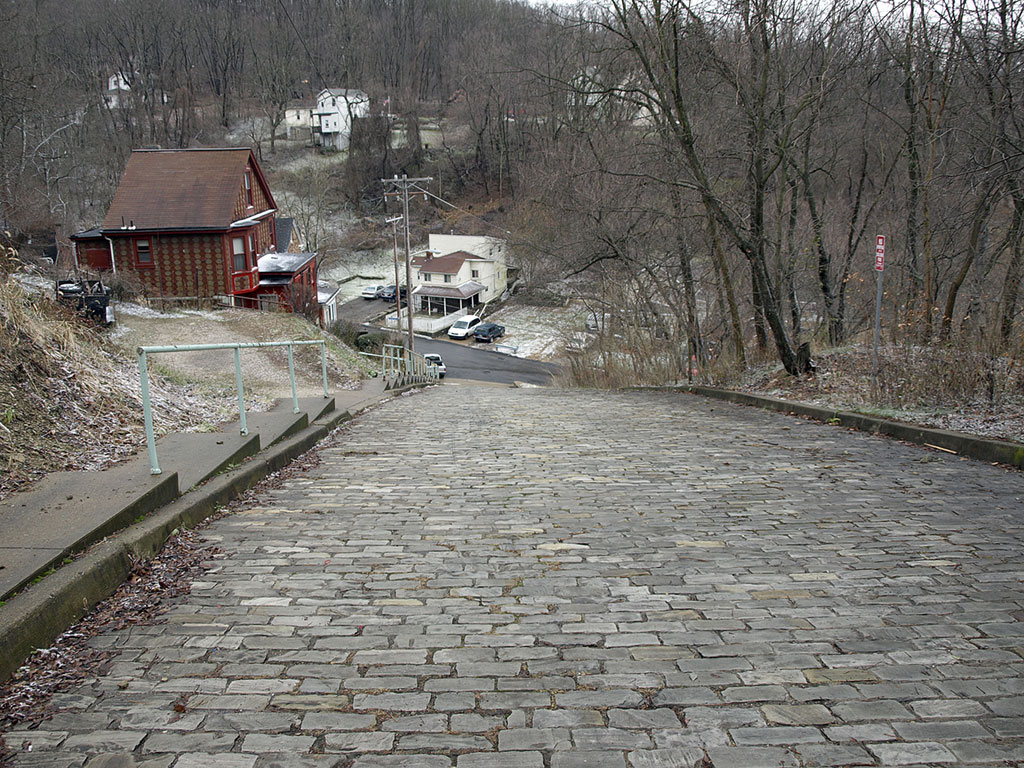
View from the top of one of the Dirty Dozen climbs, Canton Avenue

The original Dirty Dozen route included 12 climbs, and there have been as many as 15, but since 1988 the race has typically featured a baker's dozen of 13 hills. Changes to the historical route in recent years include a new first hill (57th St./Christopher in the Lawrenceville neighborhood) and a new second hill (Kendall, also in Lawrenceville), with the race no longer using Rialto St. Due to construction and other factors, the exact mix of hills will differ from year to year, as will the route (neutralized pace) between hills. The course begins at the Rhododendron Shelter in Highland Park and finishes at the top of Tesla Street in Hazelwood, crossing approximately 87 intersections in the city and nearby suburbs. The race includes several rest stops where riders re-fuel during the long event, including stops generously hosted by Pittsburgh's local neighborhood associations.

=== Historical List of Hills ===
1. Center Ave./Guyasuta Rd. in Aspinwall
2. Ravine St./Sharps Hill in O'Hara Township
3. Berryhill Rd. between Saxonburg Blvd. and Middle Rd. in O'Hara Township
4. High St./Seavy Rd. in Etna
5. Logan St. in Millvale
6. Rialto St. across from the 31st Street Bridge
7. Suffolk/Hazleton/Burgess streets on North Side
8. Sycamore St. on Mt. Washington
9. Canton Ave. in Beechview
10. Boustead St. in Beechview
11. Welsh Way on the South Side
12. Barry/Holt/Eleanor streets on the South Side
13. Flowers Ave./Tesla St. in Hazelwood

List of Hills 2022-2024

1. 57th St/Christopher
2. Kendall St.
3. Center Ave./Guyasuta Rd. in Aspinwall
4. Ravine St./Sharps Hill in O'Hara Township
5. Berryhill Rd. between Saxonburg Blvd. and Middle Rd. in O'Hara Township
6. High St./Seavy Rd. in Etna
7. Suffolk/Hazleton/Burgess streets on North Side
8. Sycamore St. on Mt. Washington
9. Canton Ave. in Beechview
10. Boustead St. in Beechview
11. Welsh Way on the South Side
12. Barry/Holt/Eleanor streets on the South Side
13. Flowers Ave./Tesla St. in Hazelwood

=== Hills 2025- ===
For 2025 Berryhill was taken out, and the formidable Logan St. returned. Year-to-year changes in the precise mix of hills, and even last-minute changes due to road closures or other factors can occur.
