= Ffordd Pen Llech =

Public road in Harlech, North Wales

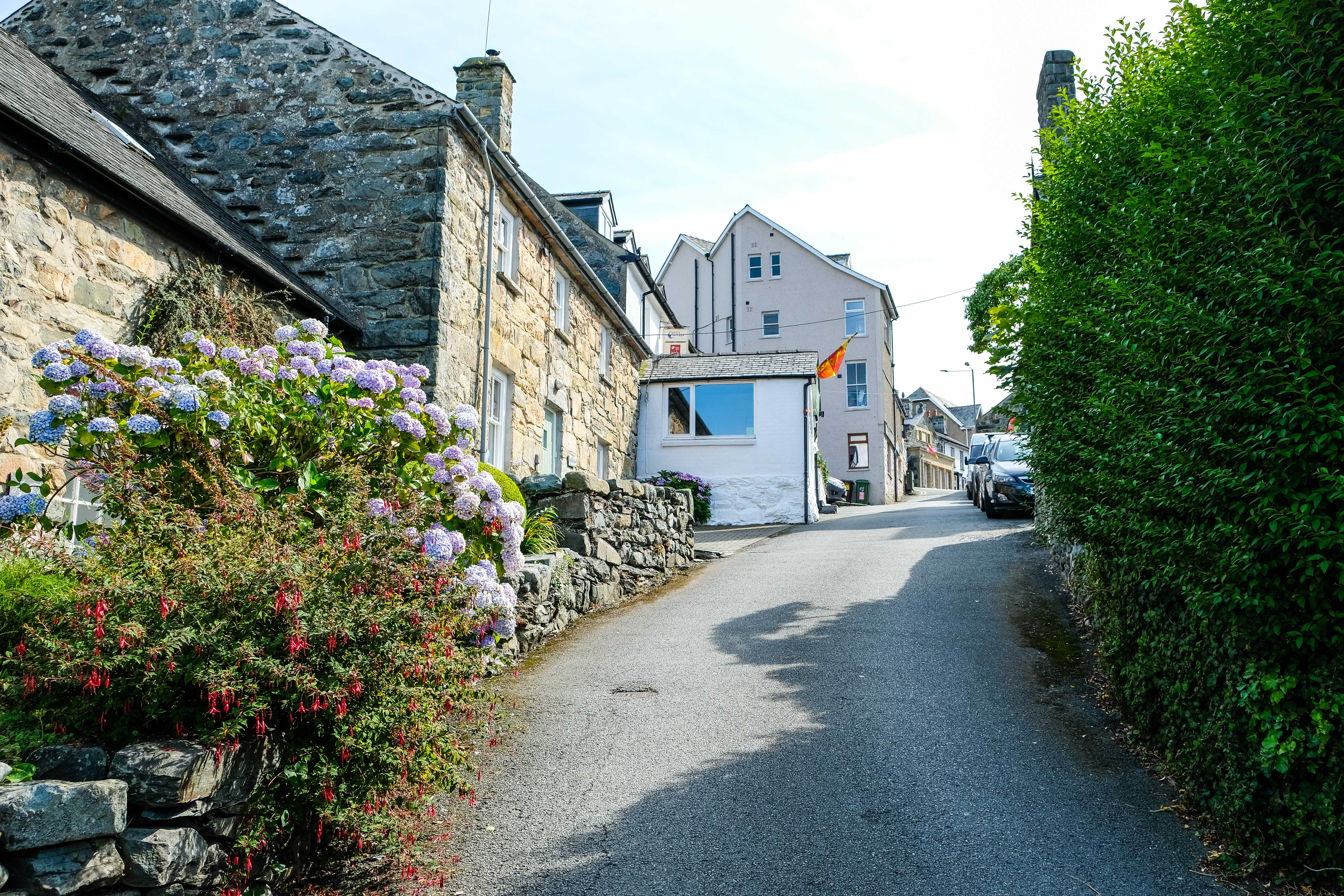
- Ffordd Pen Llech in 2019
- Interactive map of Ffordd Pen Llech
- Length: 0.2 mi (0.32 km)
- Location: Harlech, Gwynedd, Wales
- Postal code: LL46 2YL
- South end: Twtil; 52.85929°N 4.10779°W
- North end: Hwylfar Nant; 52.86177°N 4.10768°W

Ffordd Pen Llech ([fɔrð pʰɛn ɬeːχ]) is a public road in the town of Harlech which lies within Snowdonia National Park, North Wales. It was once considered the steepest street in the world, although that title reverted to the previous holder Baldwin Street on 8 April 2020.

== Toponym ==
The name Pen Llech, derived from the Welsh words pen ("head", "end", "top") and llech ("flat rock", "slab", "smooth cliff") can be translated approximately as "end of the rock", "head-stone", or perhaps "stony headland".

== Description ==
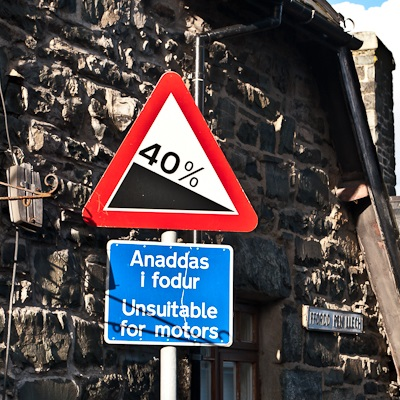
Gradient warning sign at the top of Ffordd Pen Llech

Ffordd Pen Llech is one of two roads surrounding the Harlech Castle World Heritage Site and linking the higher town centre with Harlech railway station on the Cambrian Line, as well as housing and camping areas close to sea level. Its descent of the rock spur to the north of the castle gives it a tangentially measured gradient at its steepest section of 1:2.73. Whilst this translates to the vertical rise being 36.63% of the horizontal going, it is normal practice for UK highway authorities to round gradients to a nominal figure to avoid confusing road users with excessive precision; hence the warning sign at the top gives a slope of 40%. Previously, in common with all earlier gradient warning signs in the United Kingdom, the sign displayed an arctan ratio of 1:2 1/2, and was subsequently changed to the new standard of the tangent expressed as a percentage.

The street is a two-way single-track road for the majority of its length. To avoid problems with vehicles meeting on the steepest part of the slope and being unable to restart, the lower portion of the road is a one-way descent. This is interestingly the opposite of Canton Avenue in Pittsburgh, USA, which is a one-way ascent.

== World record ==
From 15 July 2019 until 8 April 2020, the street was officially named the "World's Steepest Street" by Guinness World Records, a title previously given to Baldwin Street in Dunedin, New Zealand. Guinness measures the steepest road based on the steepest 10-metre section of the road (there are no buildings on this 10-metre section of Ffordd Pen Llech).

On 8 April 2020, Guinness announced that Baldwin Street was reinstated as the world's steepest street after determining that the best practice to calculate a street gradient is to take the measurement from the centreline. The new measurements found the street in Dunedin had a gradient of 34.8% while Ffordd Pen Llech's was calculated to be 28.6%.

The World Atlas has previously given the accolade of steepest street to Canton Avenue in Pittsburgh, Pennsylvania. Unlike Ffordd Pen Llech, Canton Avenue is entirely residential, homes are built along the steepest stretch of road, and the road is open to two-way vehicle traffic at its steepest point.

== Cycling ==
With its 165-foot (50 m) drop over a short distance, Ffordd Pen Llech is popular with cycling enthusiasts seeking extreme slopes. Its popularity is limited by the one-way system requiring downward travel only (UK law treats bicycles as vehicles and requires riders to observe all traffic signs), meaning that a cyclist would have to defy the regulation to attempt the ascent or make the upward journey via the adjacent road, Twtil, which has a shallower gradient of 25%.

== Driving ==
YouTuber HubNut (Ian Seabrook) has driven the exact same Australian-built Ford Fairmont (Australia) car down Ffordd Pen Llech in 2023 and Baldwin Street, Dunedin, New Zealand in 2019.
