= Harlech =

Seaside resort in Gwynedd, Wales

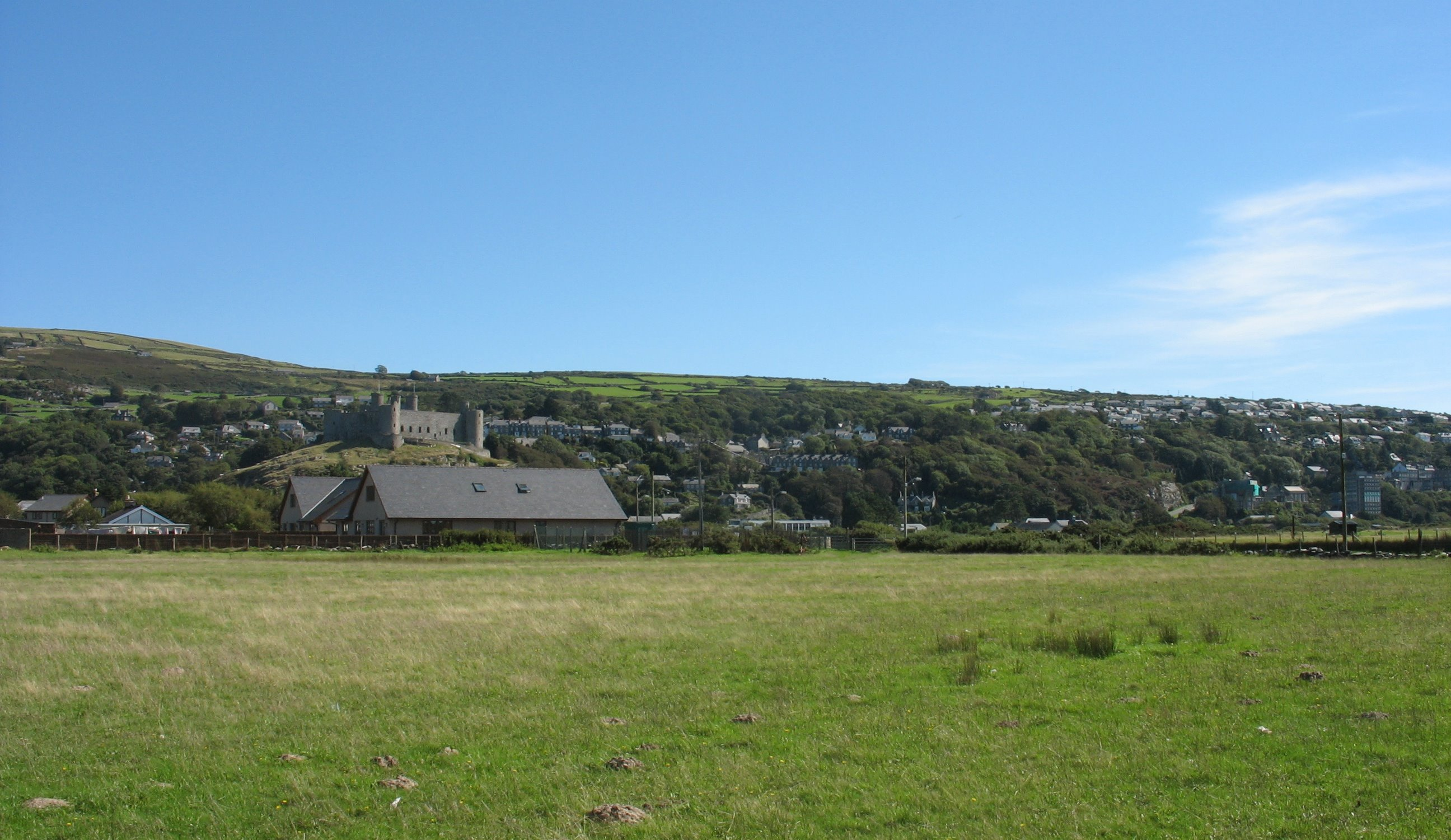
- Harlech from the beach area; the castle is seen centre-left

- Location within Gwynedd
- Population: 1,263 (2021 Census)
- OS grid reference: SH581312
- Community: Harlech
- Principal area: Gwynedd
- Preserved county: Gwynedd
- Country: Wales
- Sovereign state: United Kingdom
- Post town: HARLECH
- Postcode district: LL46
- Dialling code: 01766
- Police: North Wales
- Fire: North Wales
- Ambulance: Welsh
- UK Parliament: Dwyfor Meirionnydd
- Senedd Cymru – Welsh Parliament: Gwynedd Maldwyn
- List of places UK Wales Gwynedd 52.860°N 4.105°W Map of the community

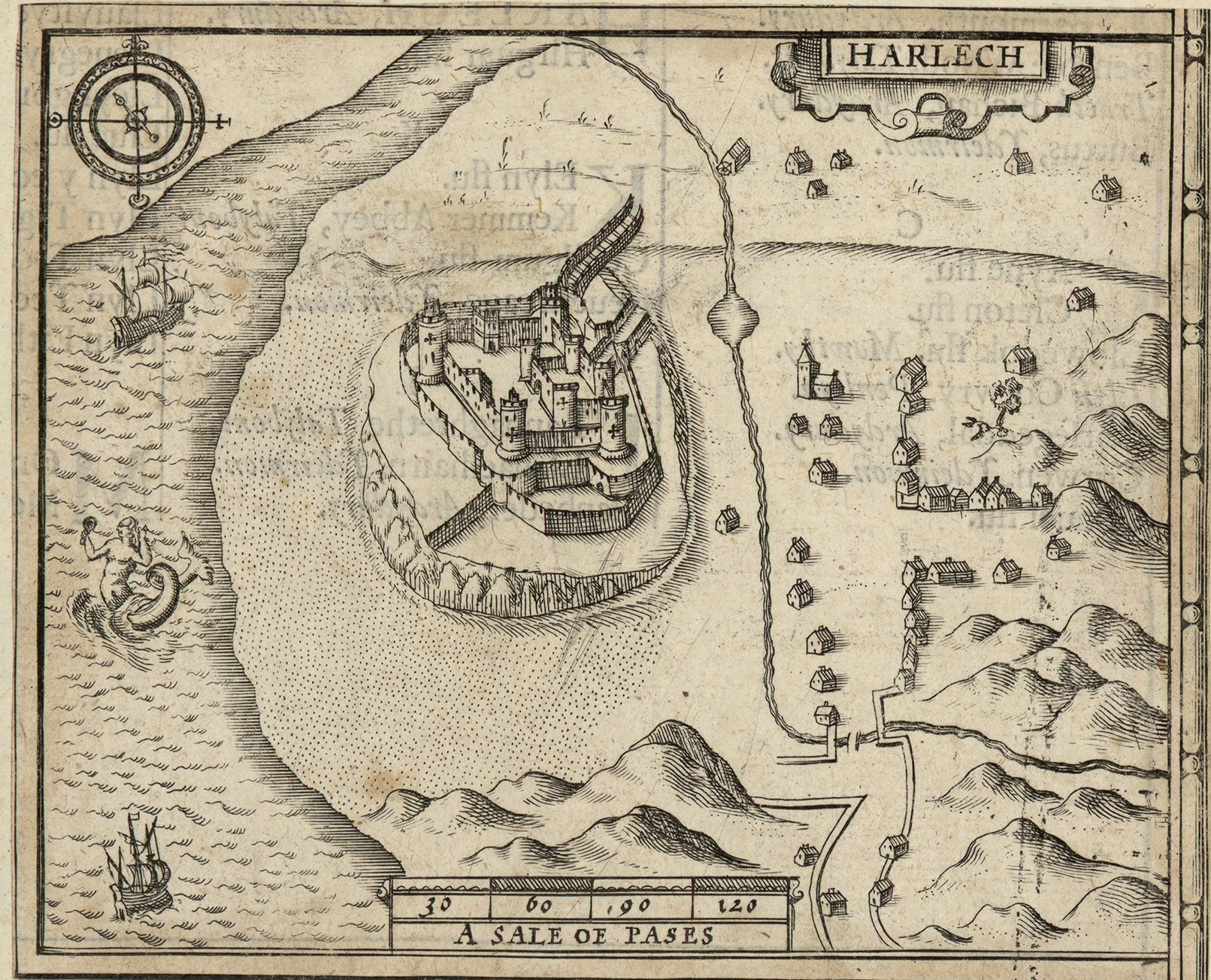
18th-century map of Harlech

Harlech (Welsh pronunciation: [ˈharlɛχ]) is a seaside resort and community in Gwynedd, North Wales, and formerly in the historic county of Merionethshire. It lies on Tremadog Bay in the Snowdonia National Park. Before 1966, it belonged to the Meirionydd District of the 1974 County of Gwynedd. Its landmark Harlech Castle was begun in 1283 by Edward I of England, captured by Owain Glyndŵr, and in the 1480s, a stronghold of Henry Tudor. Once on a seaside cliff face, it is now half a mile (800 m) inland. New housing has appeared in the low town and in the high town around the shopping street, church and castle. The two are linked by a steep road called "Twtil". Of its 1,447 inhabitants, 51 per cent habitually speak Welsh. The built-up area with Llanfair had a population of 1,762 in the 2001 census, over half of whom lacked Welsh identity, and the electoral ward which includes Talsarnau 1,997 in the 2011 census. The estimate in 2019 was 1,881. The population of the community, which includes just the village, was 1,263 as of the 2021 census.

== Etymology ==
The exact derivation of the name Harlech is unclear. Some, mostly older sources, derive it from Arddlech, i.e. ardd (high) + llech (rock), referring to the prominent crag on which the castle stands. Recent sources prefer a simpler derivation from the two Welsh words hardd (fair/fine) and llech (slate/rock).

As late as the 19th century, some texts referred to Harddlech and Harddlech Castle. This name appears in the mid-19th century translation of the Mabinogion: "And one afternoon he was at Harddlech in Ardudwy, at a court of his. And they were seated upon the rock of Harddlech overlooking the sea." Contemporary documents from the time of the Mabinogion do not mention Harlech, referring only to Llywelyn building his castle "at Ardudwy".

== Modern history ==
In 2007, a Lockheed P-38 Lightning (a World War II-era fighter aircraft) was rediscovered on Harlech beach. It has been described as "one of the most important WWII finds in recent history." The International Group for Historic Aircraft Recovery (TIGHAR) expressed an interest in salvaging the wreck of the U.S. Army Air Forces plane, known as the Maid of Harlech.

However, in August 2019, Cadw, the Welsh government's historic environment service, gave the remains scheduled status, making it the first legally designated military aircraft crash site in the UK to be protected for its historic and archaeological interest. The site is also controlled under the Protection of Military Remains Act 1986. The aircraft came down in September 1942 when it was on a gunnery practice mission. The pilot was Second Lt Robert F Elliott, 24, of Rich Square, North Carolina, survived the crash, only to be reported missing in action a few months later.

== Governance ==
An electoral ward in the same name existed including Talsarnau community. The ward population at the 2011 census was 1,997. From the 2022 Gwynedd Council election the ward was increased in size to include Llanbedr and Llanfair, renamed Harlech a Llanbedr and the representation increased to 2 county councillors.

== Transport ==
Harlech railway station is a stop on the Cambrian Coast Line. Services run between Pwllheli and Machynlleth, operated by Transport for Wales.

Local bus services are operated by Lloyds Coaches, with services to Porthmadog and Barmouth.

The town contains Ffordd Pen Llech, a street down the rock spur to the north of the castle. It is the steepest signed, public paved road in the United Kingdom and one of the steepest in the world. (Note: More details can be seen in the 'In traditional and popular culture' section below)

== Educational facilities ==
Ysgol Ardudwy is the county secondary school for children aged 11–16. Ysgol Tanycastell is the town's primary school for children aged 3–11. Wales's only long-term adult residential college, Coleg Harlech, also known as the "college of second chance", existed in the town from 1927 to 2017. It was renowned for its mixed classical and brutalist architecture. Harlech's library, previously run by Gwynedd Council, also closed in 2017. Harlech's Old Library Institute runs as Harlech Hwb, offering cost-of-living support and click-and-collect library books from Gwynedd Libraries.

== Demographics ==
The 2011 census recorded 1,762 usual residents. The village is fairly Anglicised, with 48% of residents having been born in Wales and 46.9% born in England. Correspondingly, only 42.6% reported having a Welsh national identity.

== Recreation ==
Harlech has a beach backed with sand dunes and the Royal Saint David's Golf Club, which hosted its fifth British Ladies Amateur in 2009. The Rhinogydd (or Rhinogs) range of mountains rises to the east.

Harlech has a Scout hut, which acts as a base for outdoor recreational activities.

== In traditional and popular culture ==
- A street in Harlech, Ffordd Pen Llech, was recognised in 2019 by Guinness World Records as the steepest residential street in the world with a gradient of 1:2.67 (37.45%); however, Baldwin Street in Dunedin, New Zealand, was then recognised with a gradient of 1:2.86 (35%). The steepness was determined by measuring consistently on the lower side of the street – the left or right, whichever was lower. It was later decided that measuring consistently in the middle of the street would be more accurate. This gave Baldwin Street a gradient of 34.8% and Ffordd Pen Llech one of 28.6%, so the title returned to Baldwin Street.
- In the second branch of the Mabinogi ("Branwen, Daughter of Llŷr"), Harlech is the seat of Bendigeidfran, Branwen's brother and king of the Isle of the Mighty.
- The song Men of Harlech is traditionally said to describe events during the seven-year siege of the castle in 1461–1468.
- ITV Wales & West was formerly known as HTV/Harlech Television after its founder Lord Harlech.

== Notable residents ==
In birth order:

- Owain Glyndŵr (c. 1359 – c. 1415), Welsh Rebellion leader, was the last Welshman to claim the title Prince of Wales.
- Ellis Wynne (1671 in Lasynys Fawr – 1734), Welsh-language author and clergyman
- Alfred Perceval Graves (1846–1931), poet, bard and songwriter. He and a large family, including his son the poet Robert Graves, spent summers at Erinfa, a large house north-east of Harlech.
- George Davison (1854–1930), photographer
- Lily Pincus (1898–1981), German-British social worker, marital psychotherapist and author
- Margaret More (1903–1966), composer, was born here.
- Elinor Lyon (1921–2008), children's writer, retired here in 1975 with her schoolteacher husband.
- David Gwilym Morris Roberts (1925–2020), civil engineer, was born here.
- Mari Strachan (born 1945), novelist and librarian, attended secondary school here.
- Philip Pullman (born 1946), children's novelist, attended secondary school here.
- Rachel Pearce (born 1994), rock climber, was born and lived here.

== Gallery ==
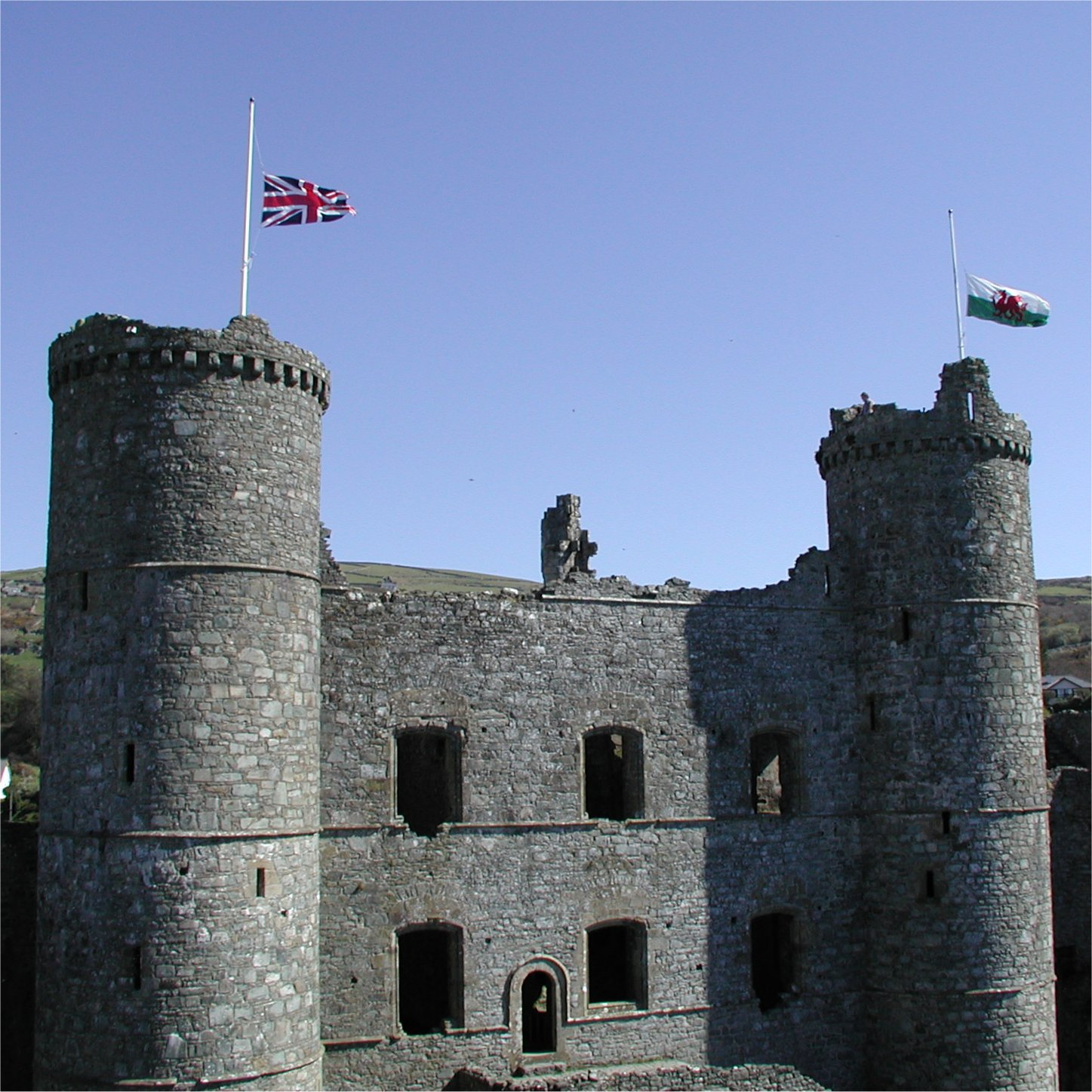
Harlech Castle with flags at half mast after the death of Queen Elizabeth the Queen Mother in 2002

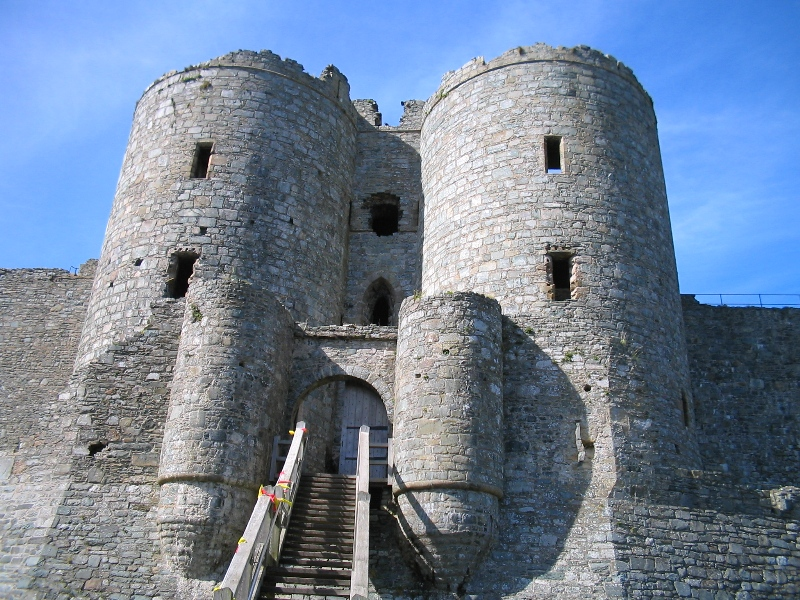
Harlech Castle gatehouse

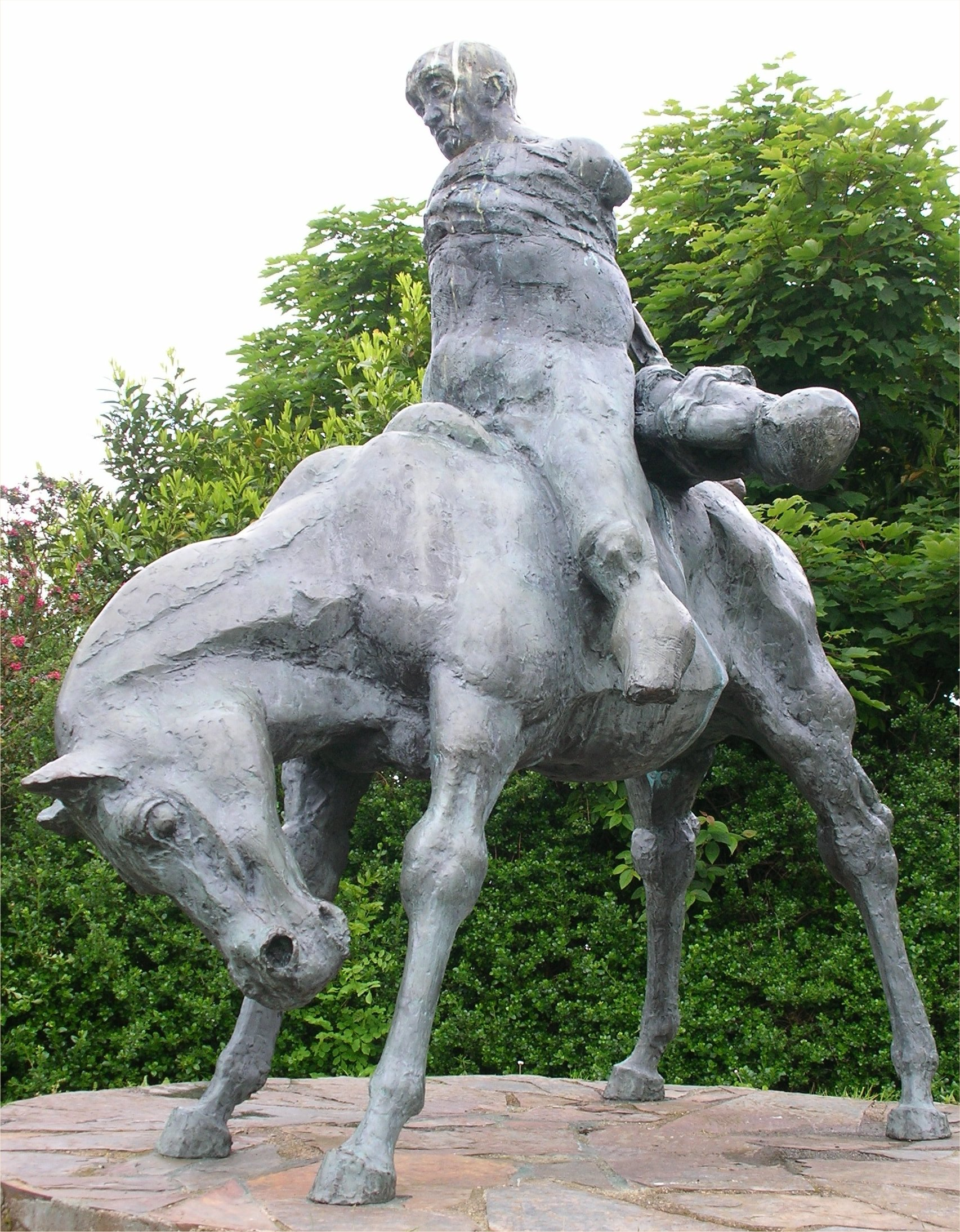
The Two Kings (sculptor Ivor Robert-Jones, 1984) near Harlech Castle, Wales. Bendigeidfran carries the body of his nephew Gwern.

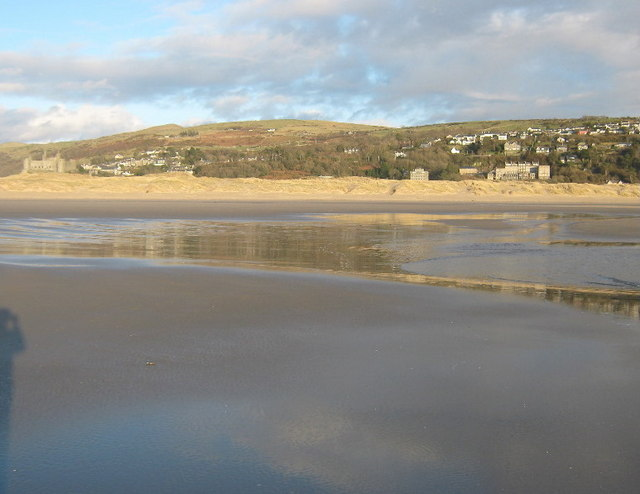
Harlech Beach at low tide

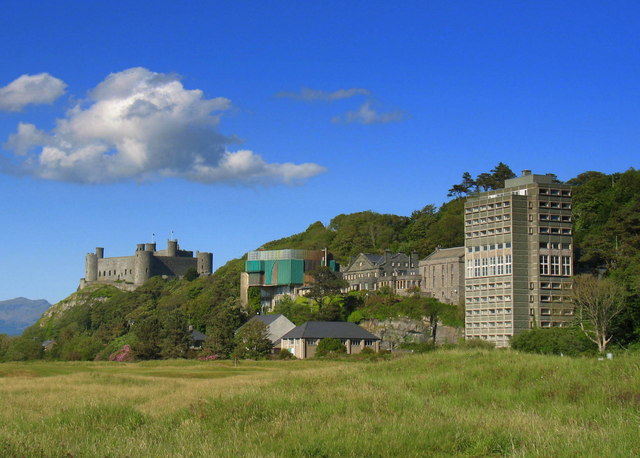
Harlech College with Harlech Castle in background

== See also ==
- Morfa Harlech sand dunes
- Harlech Castle
- St David's Hotel
- Lord Harlech
- HTV – Harlech Television
