= Baldwin Street =

Steepest street in the world

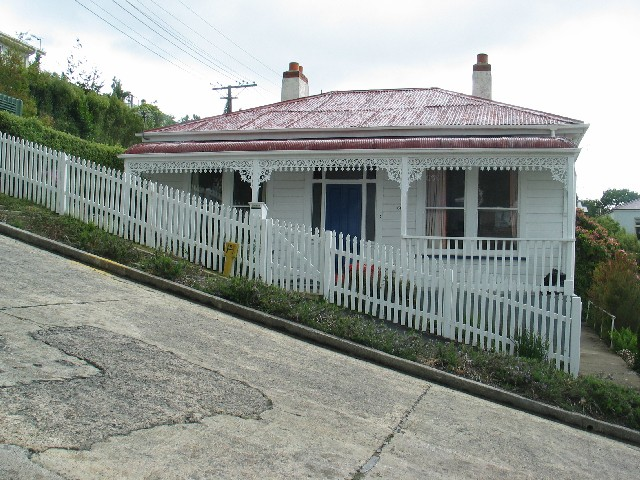
- A house on Baldwin Street
- Interactive map of Baldwin Street
- Namesake: William Baldwin
- Length: 350 m (1,150 ft)
- Location: North East Valley, Dunedin, New Zealand
- Postal code: 9010
- North end: North Road
- South end: Buchanan Street

Other
- Known for: World's steepest residential street

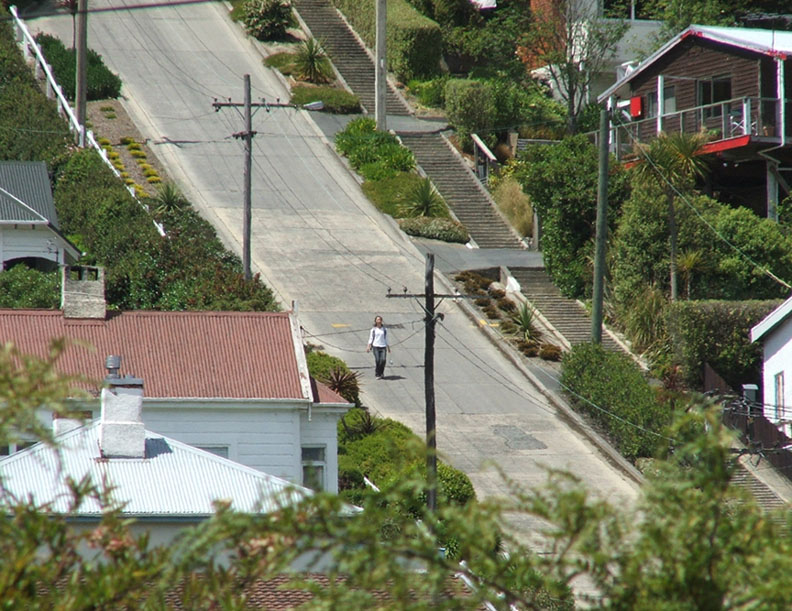
A woman descends the street

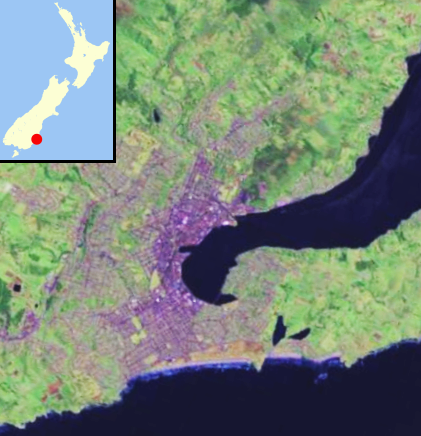
The location of Baldwin Street within Dunedin's urban area

Baldwin Street, in Dunedin, New Zealand, is located in the residential suburb of North East Valley, 3.5 kilometres (2.2 mi) northeast of Dunedin's central business district. Guinness World Records calls it the steepest street in the world, meaning no street gains more altitude in 10 horizontal metres (33 ft), measured along the street's centreline.

== Description ==
Baldwin Street runs east for about 350 metres (1,150 ft) from the valley of the Lindsay Creek up the side of Signal Hill towards Opoho, rising from 30 m (98 ft) above sea level at its junction with North Road to 100 m (330 ft) above sea level at the top, an average slope of slightly more than 1:5. The lower reaches are only moderately steep, and the surface is asphalt, but the upper reaches are steeper and surfaced in concrete (200 m or 660 ft long) for ease of maintenance and for safety in Dunedin's frosty winters.

The 161.2-metre-long (529 ft) top section climbs 47.2 metres (155 ft) vertically, an average gradient of 1:3.41. The slope of Baldwin Street is about 1:2.86 (19° or 35%) at its maximum, about 70 metres (230 ft) from the top.

Baldwin Street is a dead-end for cars, but it is linked across the top by Buchanan Street, a footpath following an unpaved road linking it with Calder Avenue and Arnold Street. The streets running parallel to Baldwin are all steep: Arnold Street (1:3.6 or 27.77%), Dalmeny Street (1:3.7 or 27%), and Calder Avenue (1:5.4 or 13%).

== History ==
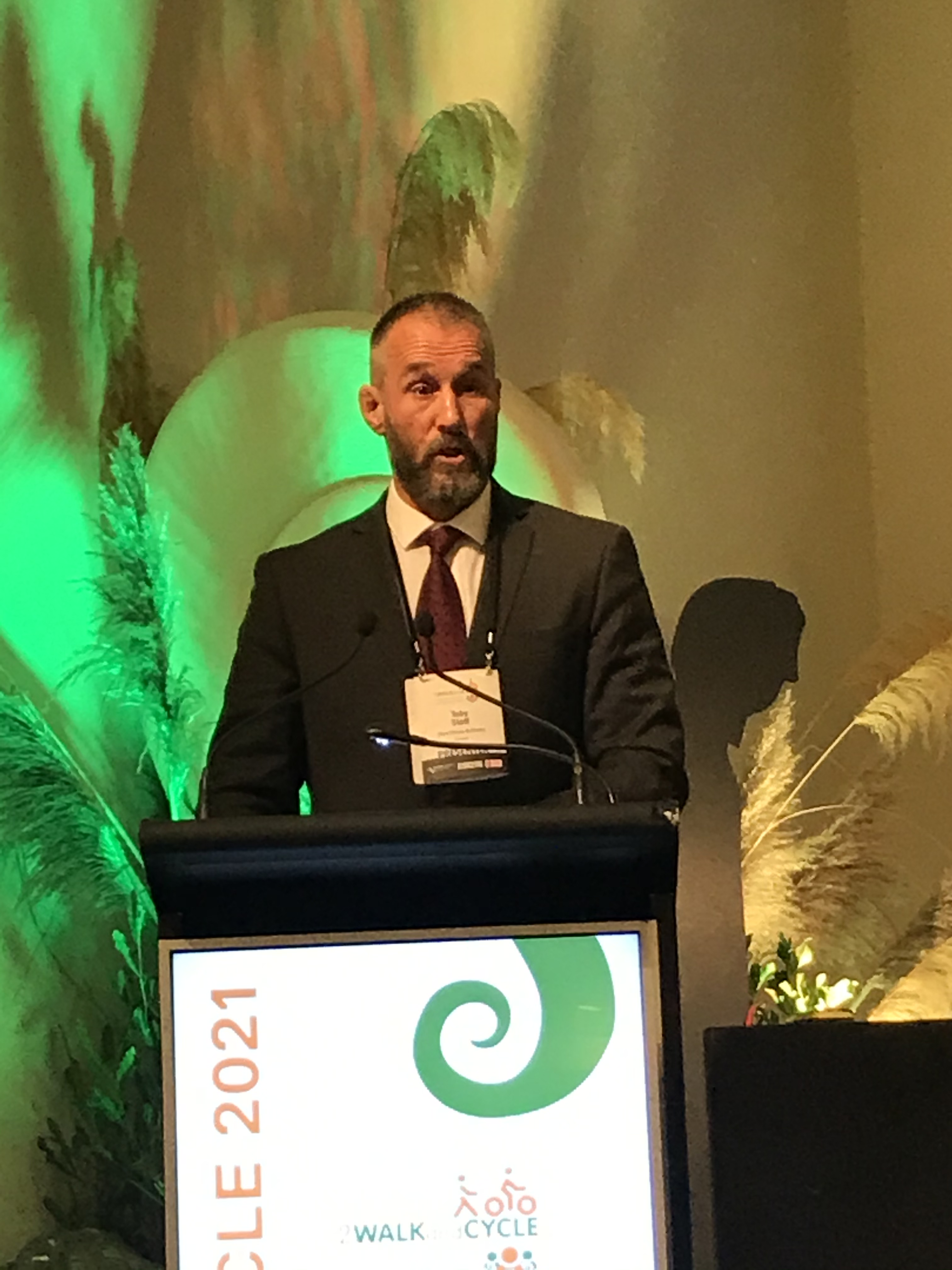
Surveyor Toby Stoff in 2021

The street's steepness was unintentional. As with many other parts of early Dunedin, and indeed New Zealand at large, streets were laid out in a grid pattern with no consideration for the terrain, usually by planners in London. In the case of Baldwin Street (and much of the Dunedin street plan), the layout was surveyed by Charles Kettle in the mid-19th century. The street is named after William Baldwin, an Otago Provincial Councillor and newspaper founder, who subdivided the area.

In 1987, Baldwin Street was recognised as the world's steepest street by the Guinness Book of Records following a two-year campaign by the broadcaster Jim Mora. At the time, Baldwin Street topped two competing streets in San Francisco, which hitherto had held the title of being the steepest streets in the world.

On 16 July 2019, Baldwin Street lost its title of World's Steepest Street to Wales's Ffordd Pen Llech, with Baldwin Street being at a gradient of 35%, while Ffordd Pen Llech being classified at a gradient of 37.45%. Mayor of Dunedin Dave Cull said that the Dunedin City Council could consider altering the signage wording from the world's steepest street to the southern hemisphere's steepest street.

On 8 April 2020, after an extensive review of an appeal to return the title to Baldwin Street filed by several Dunedin residents led by surveyor Toby Stoff, Guinness decided that the steepness of the street must be based on the central axis, which meant that Ffordd Pen Llech had a gradient of 28.6% compared to Baldwin Street's 34.8%. This meant that the title of Steepest Street was returned to Baldwin Street.

== Resident reception ==
Tourism activity and events at Baldwin Street have greatly increased after recognition as the world's steepest street, especially with the rise of social media. The street is a popular destination on tourist buses and travel guides.

Residents have mixed reception to tourist activity on the street. Many residents reported issues with some tourists being disruptive by walking in residents' gardens, lying down on the street, and being unable to turn their vehicles. Other residents have more positive thoughts, enjoying the busy activity and excitement of living on the street.

Otago Chamber of Commerce chief executive Dougal McGowan remarked that "it might be a blessing in disguise for some residents fed up with crowds of visitors, trampled gardens and bad driving decisions on the street" when Ffordd Pen Llech was briefly named the world's steepest street.

== Associated events and vehicle stunts ==
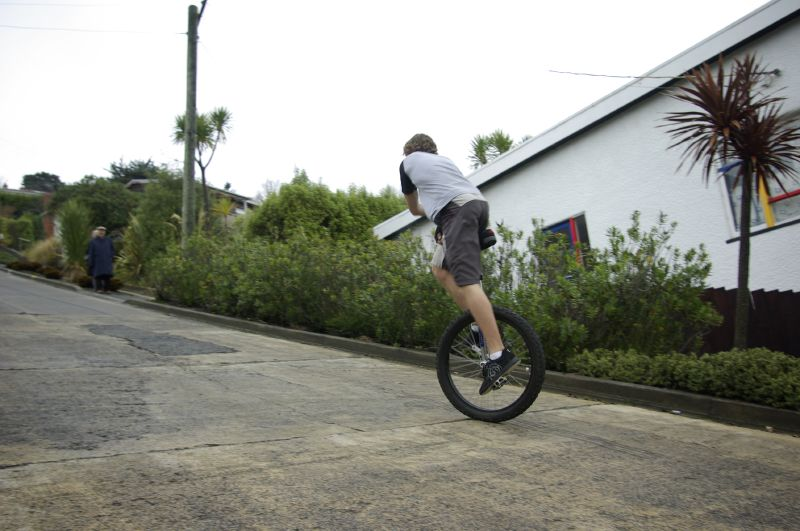
The unicyclist has to lean forward to keep his centre of gravity centred over his unicycle's contact with Baldwin Street on the steeper concrete-covered portion of the street.

Baldwin Street has attracted a lot of record hunters and daredevils attempting to either ascend or descend the street on different kinds of vehicles. Some of these attempts have been sanctioned, while others have not, including at least one fatality from misadventure. In March 2001, a 19-year-old University of Otago student was killed when she and another student attempted to travel down the street inside a wheelie bin. The bin collided with a parked trailer, killing her instantly, and causing serious head injuries for the other student.

Additionally, the street is the venue for an annual event in Dunedin, the Baldwin Street Gutbuster. Every summer since 1988, this exercise in fitness and balance involves athletes running from the base of the street to the top and back down again. The event attracts several hundred competitors annually, and the race record is 1 minute and 56 seconds, set in 1998.

Since 2002, a further charity event has been held annually in July, which involves the rolling of over 30,000 Jaffas (spherical confectionery-coated chocolate confectionery). Each Jaffa is sponsored by one person, with prizes to the winner and funds raised going to charity. This event follows a tradition started in 1998 when 2,000 tennis balls were released in a sponsored event raising money for Habitat for Humanity.

On 2 January 2010, Cardrona stuntman Ian Soanes rode down Baldwin Street on a motorcycle on one wheel. He then did a victory lap doing a wheelie up the hill one-handed while giving a thumbs-up gesture to the spectating crowd.

In April 2015, under controlled conditions, a trio of drift trike riders—Harley Jolly, 23; Tyson Barr, 18; and Nic Roy, 18—made headlines when they descended the street with speeds estimated to be up to 100 km/h (62 mph) to promote the sport. The estimated speed was approximately twice Baldwin Street's 50 km/h (31 mph) legal speed limit.

In 2017, Wyn Masters (also known as Wyn TV) performed a wheelie (in the form of a manual—that is, gravity power instead of pedalling) down the hill on a bicycle.

On 26 January 2018, 11-year-old Harry Willis raised over NZD$11,000 for the Ronald McDonald House in Christchurch by ascending the street on a pogo stick. The climb took around ten minutes. Willis's effort has since been commemorated with a plaque at the top of the street.

On 10 January 2019, a man rode a Lime scooter down Baldwin Street the same day that the scooters had been introduced to Dunedin and a week after Dunedin's mayor at the time, Dave Cull, had said he was relying "on people's common sense" not to take the scooters down the world's steepest street.

In August 2022, under controlled conditions, Australian downhill skater Zak Mills-Goodwin became the first person captured on video to hill bomb the street on a skateboard (i.e. not doing slides, which reduce speed).

Rudy Pospisil was the first to set a record of cycling up Baldwin Street in January 2017 in a time of 3:49:24. Many others have attempted the feat which increased in popularity in the early 2020s. American YouTuber and cyclist Mitch Boyer became interested circa April 2023 after hearing about a New Zealand TV news report (which aired on the programme Seven Sharp) on his filmed ascent on the then-current street steepness world record holder of Ffordd Pen Llech. One of the show's co-hosts, Hilary Barry, said: "If you can cycle up it, it's not the world's steepest street". Upon learning that Boyer was making the 30-hour trip to attempt the challenge and playfully make Barry regret her words, she offered to help film the attempts for their show. After two failed attempts, Boyer managed to scale the street, sometimes deploying a zigzagging technique (a self-imposed restriction he later discarded after the second attempt due to difficulty). He used a chainring of 52–36 and a cassette of 11–34 to get a minimum gear ratio of 1.058, including optimising the tyres for weight.

== See also ==
Other steep streets include:

- A street in Stilfs in South Tyrol (Italy) has a 40% gradient as indicated by the street sign. This is a residential street and a cul-de-sac.
- The Côte St-Ange in Chicoutimi, Quebec, Canada, with an alleged 33% gradient (about 18°). However, this again appears to be down to confusion between slope angle and percentage grade; the street is signed as having an 18% grade.
- Canton Avenue, in Pittsburgh, Pennsylvania, United States; it is officially measured to be a 37% grade. However, that angle of 37% only extends about 6.5 metres (21 ft), whereas Baldwin Street's steepest part stretches considerably farther.
- Eldred Street in Los Angeles, United States; one of three streets in Los Angeles between 32% and 33.3%.
- Filbert and 22nd Streets in San Francisco, California, United States, each have 31 to 31.5% (17°) for 60 to 70 metres (200 to 230 ft). Several short pieces of San Francisco streets are steeper, including a 9-metre section of Bradford street paved in 2010 that averages 39–40% grade.
- Waipio Valley Road (20°7′11″N 155°35′36″W) on the island of Hawaii. As measured by Stephen Von Worley, the road has long sections that measure 30% with peak gradients much higher; some areas up to 45%. This is a paved public road but it is not a residential street and is open only to 4 wheel drive vehicles.
- Ffordd Pen Llech in Harlech, Wales, has a reported slope of 36.6% (rounded to 40% on the warning sign).
- Muro di Sormano (Wall of Sormano) is a well-known cycling stage in Northern Italy, with a maximum gradient of 27%, included in the Giro di Lombardia cycling race.
- Paso Florentino in Mexico City has a reported slope of 45%. Car accidents happen frequently on the street because of the inclination.

Many streets in the west of England and in Wales have reported slopes of 33% and higher. Vale Street in Bristol is often also reported as the steepest street in Britain (21.81°/40.02%) and hence may have a slope even steeper than 36.6%. However, these roads are mostly shorter roads than those listed above, with far more frequent turns as opposed to the straight path of Baldwin.

== Gallery ==
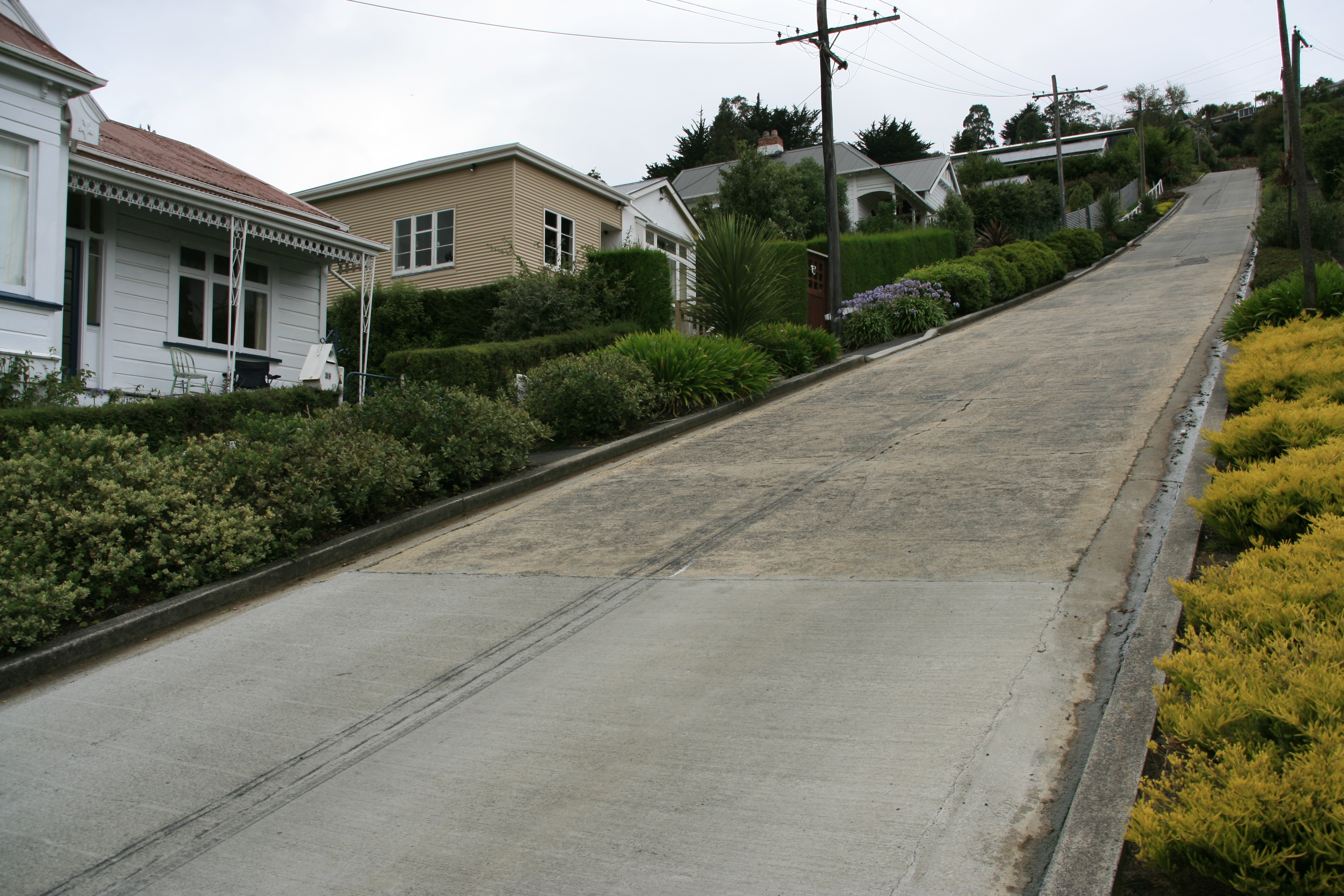
Looking upwards

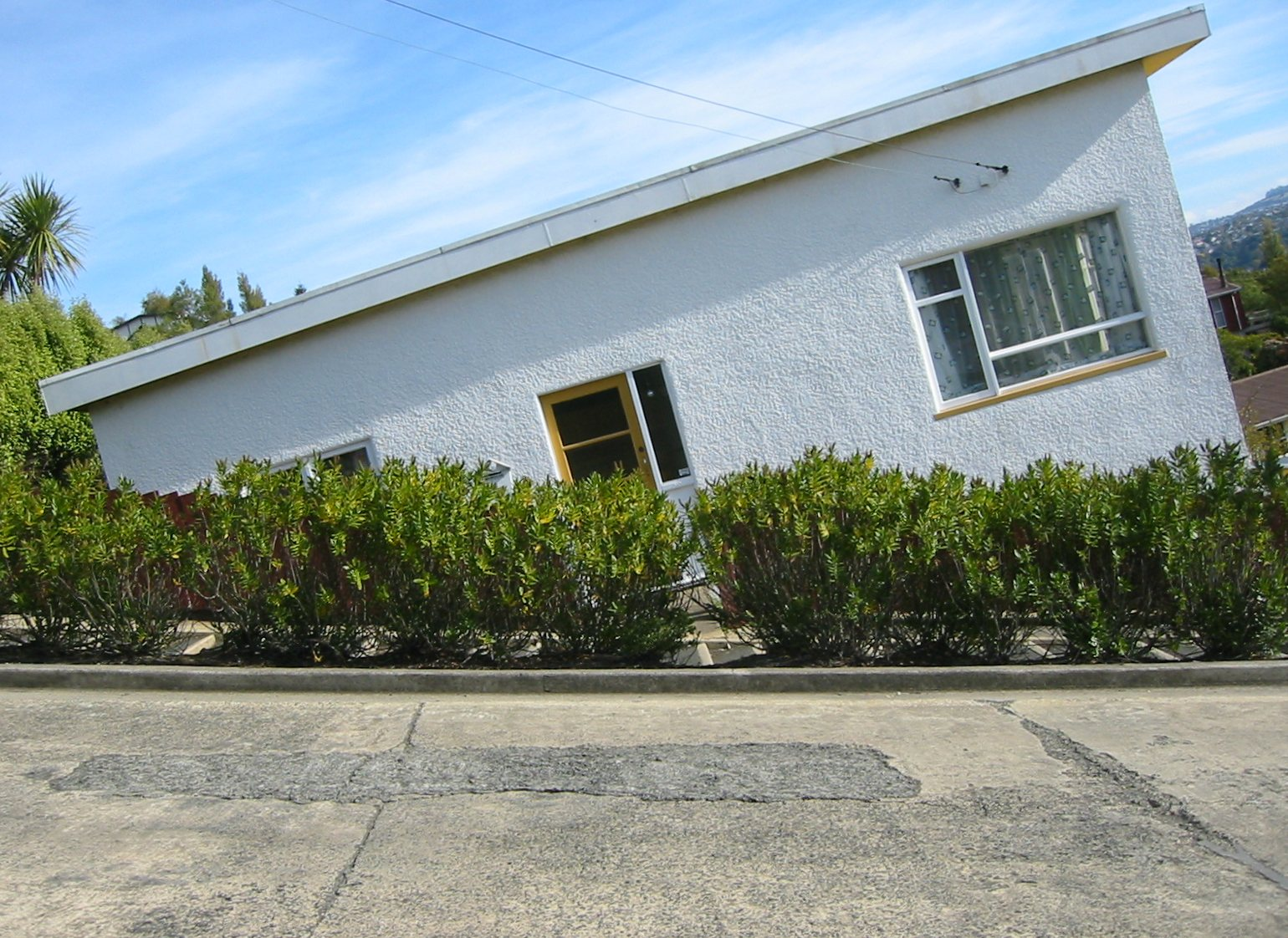
Photographed with the street level

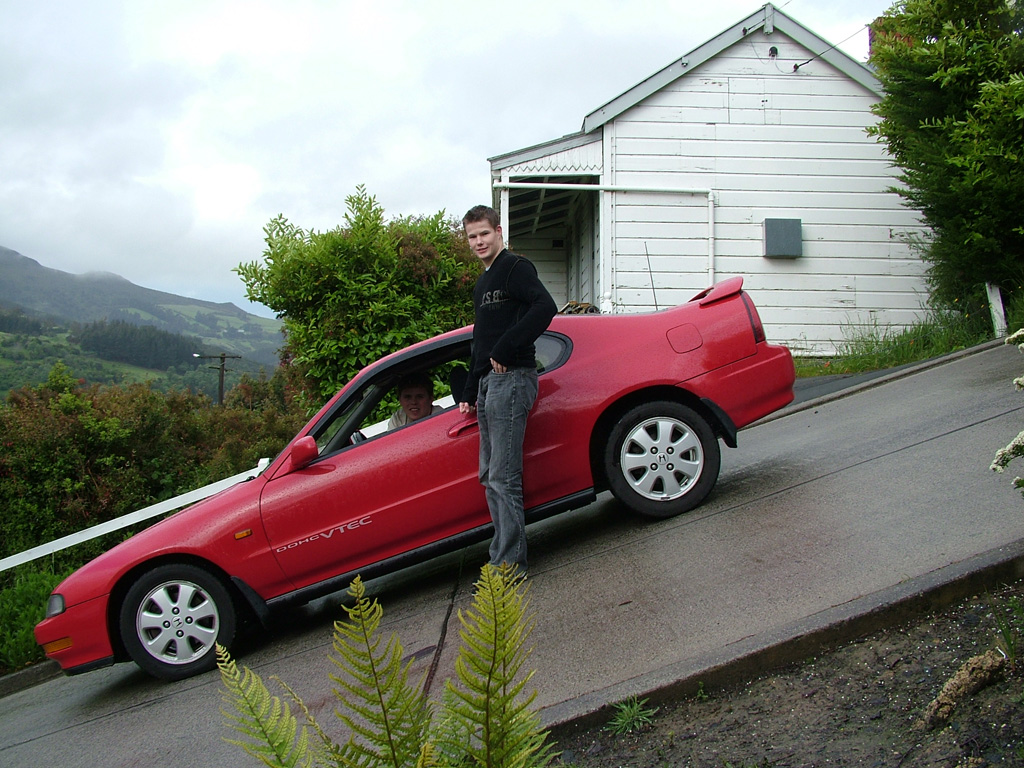
Parked car

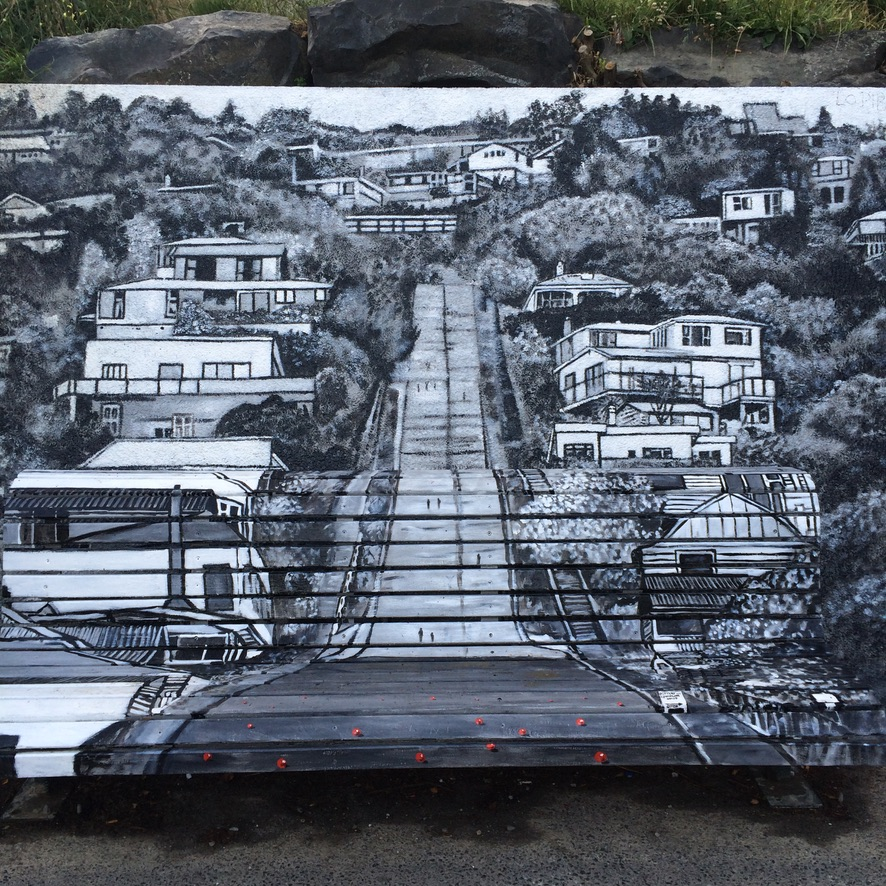
Bench at the top, painted to match the street

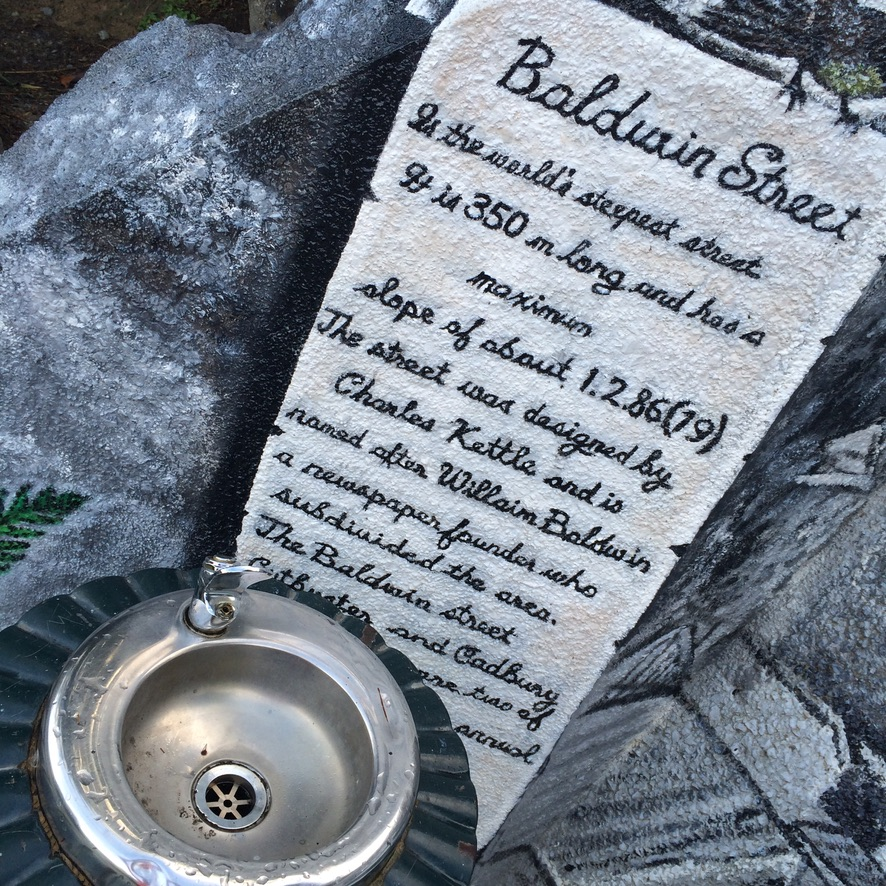
Water fountain and sign at the top

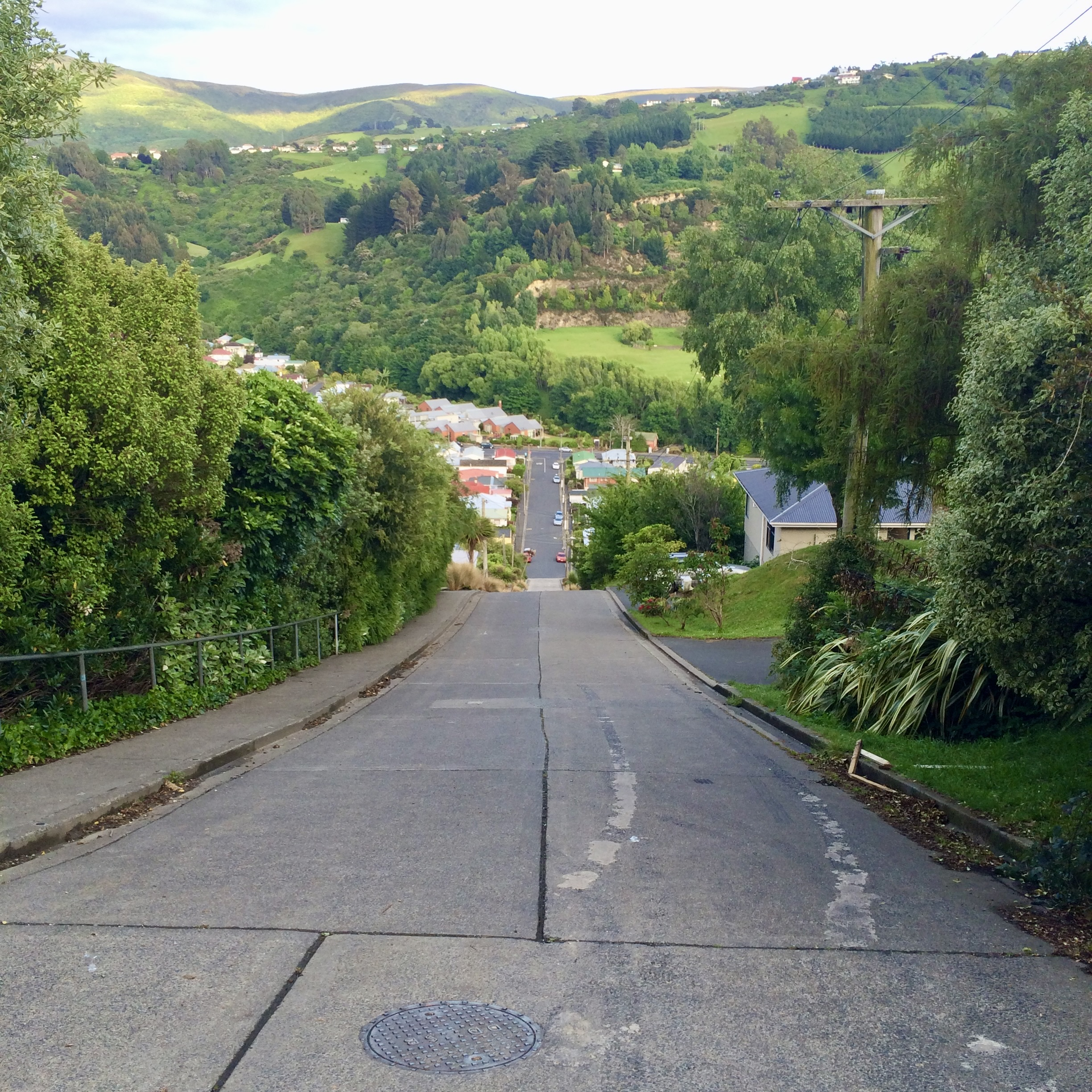
View down Baldwin Street from the very top
