= Canton Avenue =

Street in Pittsburgh, Pennsylvania, United States

Coordinates: 40.409°N 80.03°W

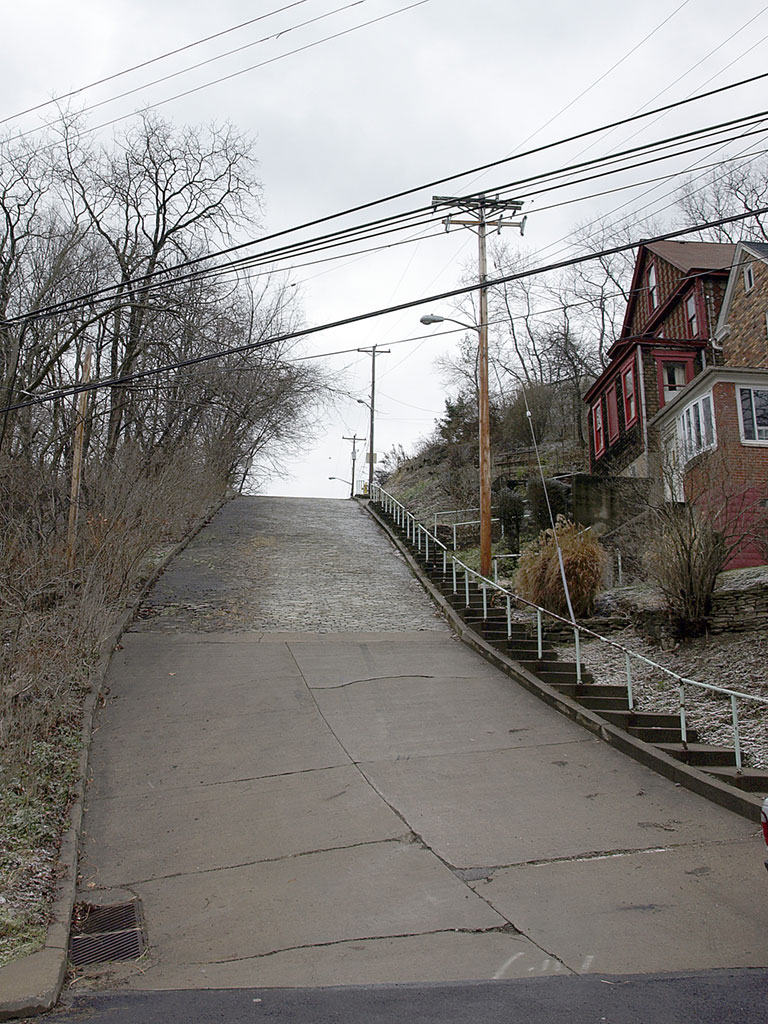
- Looking up Canton Avenue.
- Interactive map of Canton Avenue
- Location: Pittsburgh, Pennsylvania, United States
- South end: Coast Avenue
- North end: Hampshire Avenue

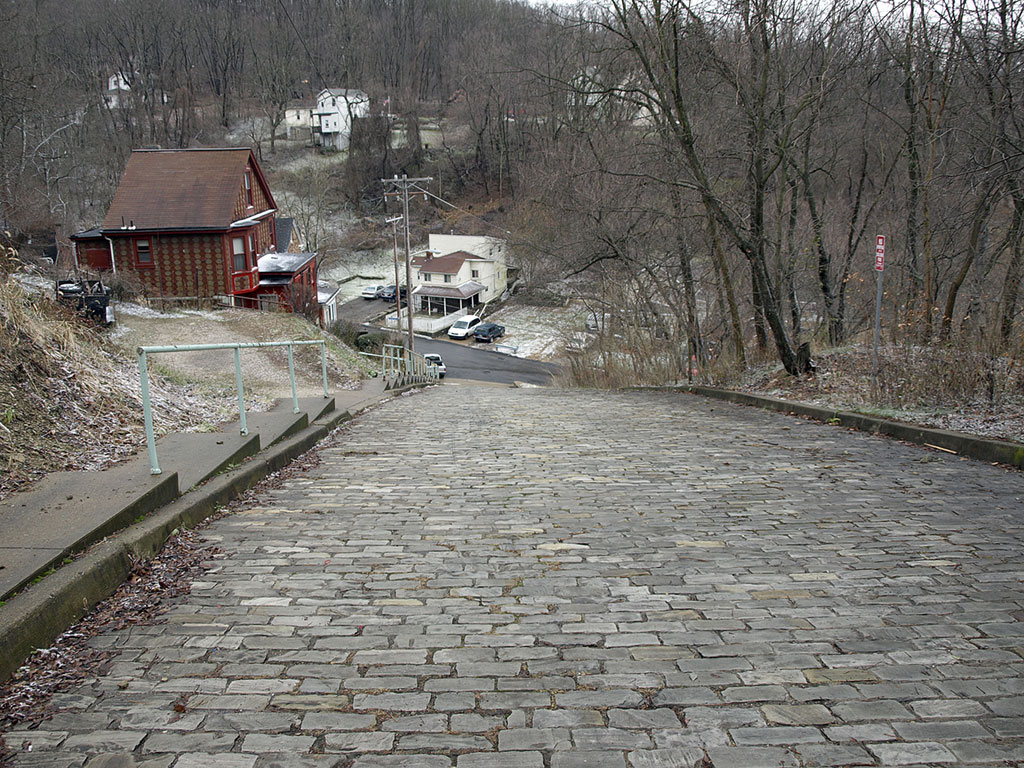
Canton Avenue, seen from the top.

Canton Avenue is a street in Pittsburgh's Beechview neighborhood which is the steepest officially recorded public street in the United States.

== Description ==
Canton Avenue is 630 feet (190 m) long (the hill is about 213 feet (65 m) long) and is claimed to include a 37% grade 21 feet (6.4 m) long.

The Guinness Book of World Records uses a 10 m (33 ft) section to define the world's steepest street, held by Baldwin Street, in Dunedin, New Zealand, with a gradient of 34.8%. This record is disputed; Pittsburgh news and international media have claimed Canton Avenue is the steepest street in the world.

The United States record is also disputed, as Bradford Street in San Francisco includes a 39% grade 9 meters (30 ft) long, and Waipio Valley Road in Hawai'i has sections as steep as a 45% grade.

== History ==
In March 2016, Canton Avenue was the subject of a commercial, featuring freeskier Bene Mayr, snowboarder Heikki Sorsa, downhill mountain biker Aaron Gwin, and racing driver Mattias Ekström for the Audi Quattro A4 automobile.

== See also ==
- Baldwin Street
- Dirty Dozen (bicycle competition)
