= Manawydan fab Llŷr =

Welsh legendary tale

- "Manawydan, son of Llŷr" "The Mabinogi of the Collar and the Hammer"
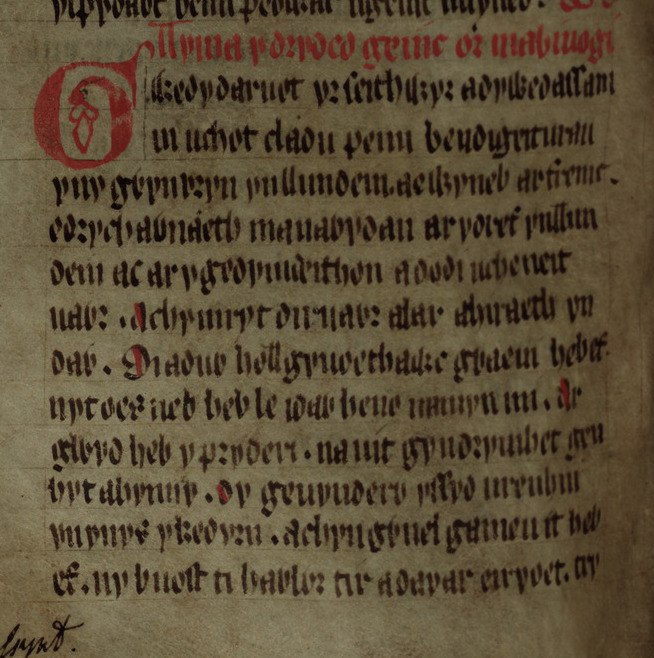
- Opening lines of the third branch of the Mabinogi: And after the travellers buried Bendigeidfran's head in the Gwynfryn in London with his face towards France, Manawydan looked at the town and at his friends, and sighed deeply. (Bodleian Library's manuscript)
- Author(s): Unknown, generally believed to be a scribe from Dyfed.
- Language: Middle Welsh
- Date: Earliest manuscript dates to 14th century; tale believed to be much older.
- Series: Four Branches of the Mabinogi
- Genre: Welsh mythology
- Subject: Third branch of the Mabinogi. Return of Pryderi and Manawydan to Britain, wasting of Dyfed, imprisonment of Rhiannon and Pryderi, their subsequent release and the restoration of Dyfed.
- Setting: Mainly Dyfed, also England.
- Period covered: Mythological
- Personages: Manawydan, Pryderi, Rhiannon, Cigfa, Caswallon fab Beli, Llwyd ap Cil Coed

Manawydan fab Llŷr; "Manawydan, the son of Llŷr" is a legendary tale from medieval Welsh literature and the third of the four branches of the Mabinogi. It is a direct sequel to the second branch, Branwen ferch Llŷr, and deals with the aftermath of Bran's invasion of Ireland and the horrific enchantment that transforms Dyfed into a wasteland. The chief characters of the tale are Manawydan, rightful king of Britain, his friend Pryderi, the king of Dyfed and their respective wives Rhiannon and Cigfa. Along with the other branches, the tale can be found in the medieval Red Book of Hergest and White Book of Rhydderch. Allusions to the tale can be found in two old triads retained in the Trioedd Ynys Prydein.

Will Parker has suggested that the branch draws heavily on the Expulsion of the Déisi, the tale of the Irish tribe that settled in South-West Wales during the Early Middle Ages and founded the Kingdom of Dyfed, as well as the Irish saga Cath Maige Mucrama, which shares a number of structural and thematic similarities with Manawydan. He describes the third branch as the "foundation myth of the Cymbro-Gaelic royal house of Dyfed..."

The branch is followed by the tale of Math fab Mathonwy, in which the setting is transferred from Dyfed to Gwynedd.

== Synopsis ==
Having honoured the last requests of his brother Bendigeidfran, by burying his head facing France so as to ward off invasion, Manawydan accompanies his friend Pryderi to the kingdom of Dyfed, where the latter is reunited with his wife Cigfa. During his stay, Manawydan marries Rhiannon, Pryderi's widowed mother, while Pryderi heads off to Kent to pay homage to the usurper Caswallon. Soon after, a magical mist descends on the land leaving it empty of all domesticated animals and humans apart from the four protagonists.

Pryderi and Manawydan travel to England to make a living from various trades, but are forced to leave one town after another to avoid conflict with other tradesmen who resented their superior skills. Returning to Dyfed, Manawydan and Pryderi go hunting and, coming across a white boar, follow it to a huge, towering fort. Against Manawydan's advice, Pryderi enters the fort and is drawn towards a beautiful golden bowl. Upon touching the bowl, his feet stick to the floor, his hands stick to the bowl and he loses the power of speech. Manawydan waits in vain for his return before giving news of his disappearance to Rhiannon. Chiding her husband for his poor companionship, Rhiannon too enters the fort and suffers the same fate as her son. In a "blanket of mist", Pryderi, Rhiannon and the fort itself, vanish. Cigfa weeps at the loss of her husband, but is comforted by Manawydan, and the two head off to England before being driven out, once again, due to their superior craftmanship.

Upon returning to the wasteland, they sow three fields of wheat but the first field is destroyed before it can be harvested. The next night the second field is destroyed. Manawydan keeps watch over the third field and when he sees it destroyed by mice he catches one and decides to hang it the next day. A scholar, a priest and a bishop in turn offer him gifts if he will spare the mouse but he refuses. When asked what he wants in return for the mouse's life he demands the release of Pryderi and Rhiannon and the lifting of the enchantment over Dyfed. The bishop agrees because the mouse is in fact his wife. It is revealed that the catalyst of their suffering was the enchanter Llwyd ap Cil Coed, who sought revenge for the humiliation of his friend Gwawl ap Clud at the hands of Pwyll and Rhiannon. The enchantment over Dyfed is lifted.
