= Llwyd ap Cil Coed =

- First appearance: Third Branch of the Mabinogi

In-universe information
- Alias: Bishop (disguise)
- Gender: Male
- Occupation: Sorcerer
- Affiliation: Gwawl ap Clud
- Family: Gwenaby (wife)
- Relatives: Manawydan ap Llŷr, Pryderi, Rhiannon, Gwawl ap Clud

Llwyd ap Cil Coed (Welsh pronunciation: [ɬʊi̯d/ ap / kiːl / kɔi̯d]) is a figure in Welsh mythology who serves as the primary antagonist in the Third Branch of the Mabinogi, known also as the story of Manawydan ap Llŷr.

== In the Mabinogi ==
Llwyd is a friend of Gwawl ap Clud, who had been insulted by Pwyll in the First Branch. Llwyd decides to avenge this insult upon Pwyll's son, Pryderi by making barren and empty the kingdom of Dyfed. Later, by means of an enchanted bowl in a mysterious fortress, he imprisons Pryderi and Rhiannon—Pwyll's widow and Pryderi's mother. Llwyd seems to make Rhiannon bear the yokes of his horses, while Pryderi has to carry the gate hammers during their captivity.

Only Manawydan, Rhiannon's new husband, and Pryderi's wife Cigfa remain in Dyfed. They try to plant grain, but their crop is destroyed by mice. Manawydan chases the pests away, but catches one that is fat and slower than the others and sets out to hang it for theft. A cleric, a priest, and a bishop come by one at a time and beg Manawydan to spare the mouse, but he refuses until the bishop agrees to remove the enchantment from Dyfed. He finally reveals himself as Llwyd in disguise and admits that the mice were really his attendants magically transformed. The mouse is his pregnant wife, Gwenaby, but Manawydan refuses to free her until Llwyd also releases Rhiannon and Pryderi and pledges to take no further revenge. Llwyd agrees to these terms and turns his wife back into a beautiful woman.

== In Arthurian legend ==
A character named Llwydeu ap Cilcoed appears in the early Arthurian tale Culhwch and Olwen in which he is named as one of the many knights of Arthur's court. After stealing a cauldron from Diwrnach the Irishman, Arthur and his men land at Llywdeu's house in Porth Cerddin in Dyfed.
