= Epona =

Gallo-Roman goddess of horses and fertility

- Gallo-Roman Horse Goddess
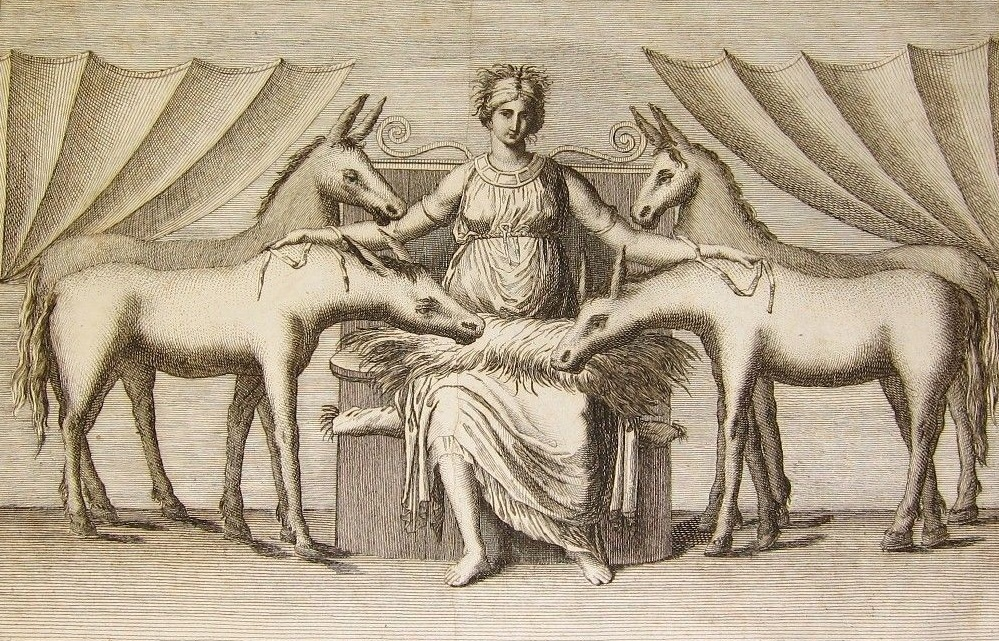
- Epona surrounded by four foals in the stables of a circus, engraved from a lost wall panting in the Circus of Maxentius
- Venerated in: Roman Empire
- Symbols: Foal, patera, corn, fruit, cornucopia
- Day: December 18
- Mount: Mare
- Gender: Female
- Ethnic group: Gauls

In Gallo-Roman religion, Epona was the goddess of horses and ponies. She was also a fertility and mother goddess, and was frequently depicted in art and sculptures either mounted on a horse, etc., (usually in sidesaddle position) or sitting on a throne with foals, or standing beside a foal.

She is typically depicted holding a patera, cornucopia, fruit, bread, (wheat, grain); (Note: Aldhouse-Green (1984), p. 146 and (2017)) or accompanied by a foal or foals. (Note: Aldhouse-Green (1984), p. 195: "On stelae dedicated to her, she is often depicted with mares and/or foals". Aldhouse-Green (2017) and Irby-Massie (2018) mention the § Example from Britain, the bronze statuette, British Museum. Epona with two ponies, also holding sheaf of corn-ears.) (Note: Reinach (1898), p. 198 notes a bas relief example of Museum of Worms, "with basket or patera below her knees between two foals", of the type No. 64).)

She may have had a death goddess's aspect, and it is speculated that She (and her horses) might have been regarded as escorting souls to the world of the afterlife. (Note: Aldhouse-Green (2017): "at the great cemetery of Horgne au Sablon.. Onon relief from this site Epona rides.. and behind them walks a human figure whom some have interpreted as the soul of a deceased believer being led to the otherworld".) (Note: Forcey (1998) identifying Epona as chthonic, and quoting Ross (1975).)

Various scholars also point to the parallel between Epona and the Welsh legendary figure Rhiannon (also closely associated with horses), and in the first branch of the Mabinogion (Pwyll Pendefig Dyfed), Rhiannon rides up to the tower to meet the title hero Pwyll who is not only lord of Dyfed, but the "Head of Annwn (the Ohterworld/Underworld)". (Note: Hubert supposes that the Epono pedestal found at Waldfischbach in the Palatinate depicts the mounted goddess facing a tower, matching the Rhiannon episode in the Mabinogion.)

Epona's worship as the patroness of cavalry was widespread in the Roman Empire between the 1st and 3rd centuries AD. While adopted Celtic deities were usually only associated with specific localities, Epona was "the sole Celtic divinity ultimately worshipped in Rome itself."

== Etymology ==
The name Epona ('Great Mare') originates from Gaulish, an extinct Celtic language. It is derived from the reconstructed Proto-Indo-European word for horse: *éḱwos, which appeared in the reconstructed Proto-Celtic language as *ekʷos ('horse'), (Note: Schmidt gives *eḱuos for a reconstructed ancestor but does not clarify if this is PIE or proto-Celtic.) and later became the Celtic Gaulish epos ('horse'). The word is paired with the augmentative suffix -on which is frequently, although not exclusively, found in theonyms (ex. Sirona, Matrona) and the usual Gaulish feminine singular -a. Alternately, scholars have suggested that the -ona (or -ana) suffix references sacred water, specifically springs or other water sources. (Note: Reinach (1903) ventured a hypothesis that the goddess Epona signified "horse-spring" and was originally depicted in the form of a horse (""représentée par une cavale), and later altered by "les progrès de l'anthropomorphisme.) The word survives in modern Welsh as 'Ebol' and in Welsh placenames such as Ebbw Vale.

== Literary attestations ==
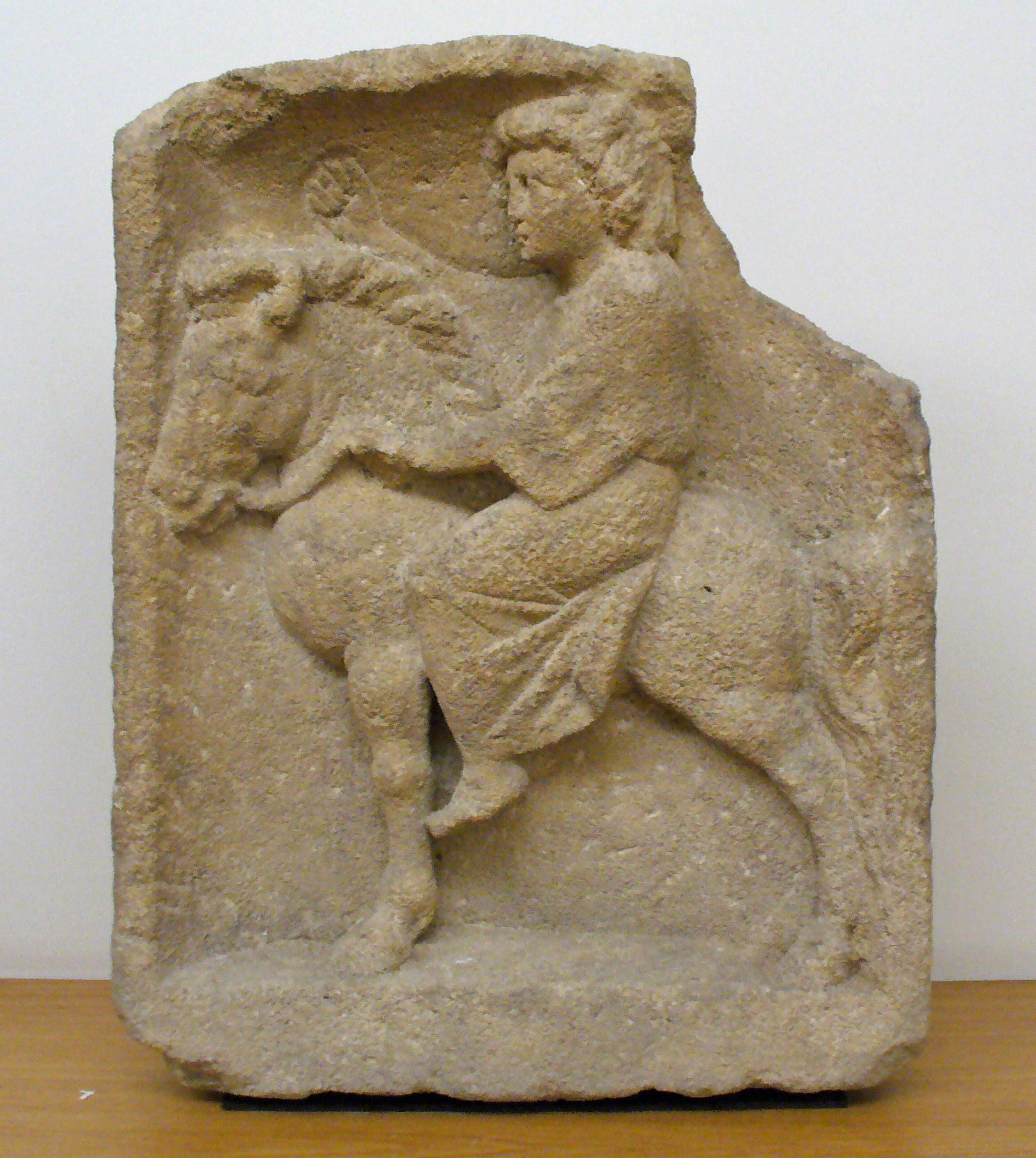
Epona, second or third century AD, from Contern, Luxembourg (Musée national d'art et d'histoire, Luxembourg City)

A number of Roman writers allude to Epona's cult, and it is rare for a Celtic deity be found in so many instances of mention in classical literature, though the amount of information that can be garnered is still scarce, despite the roster of authors.

One of the earliest attestations to Epona as a goddess is the Satires (100–127 CE) of Juvenal, which links the worship and iconography of Epona to stables. Epona is mentioned in The Golden Ass (2nd century CE) by Apuleius, where in a scene set in northern Greece (Thessaly, famed for horse-breeding), an aedicular niche with her image on a pillar in a stable has been garlanded with freshly picked roses:

Sic adfectus atque in solitudinem relegatus angulo stabuli concesseram. Dumque de insolentia collegarum meorum mecum cogito atque in alterum diem auxilio rosario Lucius demo futurus equi perfidy vindictam meditor, respicio pilae mediae, quae stabuli trabes sustinebat, in ipso fere meditullio Eponae deae simulacrum residens aediculae, quod accurate corollis roseis equidem recentibus fuerat ornatum.

— Apuleius, Metamorphoses, iii.27
Translation:

As I stood in my lonely corner, banished from the society of my four-footed colleagues and deciding on a bitter revenge on them next morning as soon as I had eaten my roses and become Lucius again, I noticed a little shrine of [the Mare-headed Mother,] the Goddess Epona, standing in a niche of the post that supported the main beam of the stable. It was wreathed with freshly gathered roses....

— Robert Graves's translation, V: 27 (Note: In Robert Graves's translation of The Golden Ass, he has interposed an explanatory "the Mare-headed Mother" that does not appear in the Latin text; it would have linked Epona with the primitive mythology of Demeter, who was covered as a mare by Poseidon in stallion-form (see above); there is no justification for identifying Epona with Demeter, however.)

As the two above literary instances suggest, Epona artefacts have been discovered at stable sites (cf. § pStable finds)

A euhemeristic account of Epona's origin is found in the Parallela Minora, attributed to Pseudo-Plutarch:

Fulvius Stellus hated women and used to consort with a mare and in due time the mare gave birth to a beautiful girl and they named her Epona. She is the goddess that is concerned with the protection of horses. So Agesilaüs in the third book of his Italian History.

The tale was conveyed in Giambattista Della Porta's edition of Magia naturalis (1589), erroneously citing Plutarch's Life of Solon. It may represent some recollection of ancient Indo-European horse sacrifice— such as the Vedic ashvamedha or the Irish ritual described by Giraldus Cambrensis— both of which are related to kingship. In the Celtic ritual, the king mates with a white mare thought to embody the goddess of sovereignty.

Pausanias relates a similar Greek myth regarding Demeter Erinys ('Vengeful Demeter'), who, in the form of a mare, was raped by Poseidon in the form of a stallion. Demeter was venerated as a mare at Lycosoura in Arcadia.

== Functions and worship ==
Epona likely embodied the domesticated aspects of the horse— representing fertility, abundance, reproduction, and protection. She was likely also viewed as a protectress of not just horsemen (including cavalry soldiers, charioteers, muleteers), but of horse-breeding, and venerated by the related professions, such as stable hands, grooms, as well as anyone engaged in any sort of transit or commerce relating to horses, (Note: Turcan, Robert (1996) The Cults of the Roman Empire, p. 23 apud Jovičić & Bogdanović (2017), p. 38) including travellers on horseback. (Note: Gillespie (2018) citing Linduff (1979); Aldhouse-Green (2003) "Poles apart ? Perceptions of gender in Gallo-British cult-iconography", pp. 102–106.)

The attestation in the Roman work by Apuleius (cf. § Literary attestations) leads to the supposition that altars dedicated to the goddess were commonly placed in stables wherever in the Roman empire. While she was later associated with the cavalry due to the circumstance of Gaul being subjugated under Rome (and many Celts were hired as cavalrymen for the auxilary), iconography indicates that prior to Roman contact she was likely a peaceful divinity, associated with fertility and protection rather than war.

=== Epona in Gaul ===
In regional cults in Roman-occupied Gaul, Epona was worshipped as a mother goddess who oversaw the welfare of horses, donkeys, mules, and their riders. Horses were a key component of Pre-Roman Gallic life; Gallic soldiers held their horses in high regard, as seen by Vercingetorix sending away his horses rather than letting them be captured or killed.

Some objects dedicated to the goddess also suggest that she played a funerary role; additionally, horses were believed to guide the soul into the afterlife in some ancient cultures. Fernand Benoît suggested that images of Epona, in addition to those of the serpent-tailed ("anguiforme") daemon, symbolized a theme of victory over death; he found both images to be manifestations of Mediterranean symbolism, which reached Gaul through contacts with Etruria and Magna Graecia.

=== Roman Epona ===
When Romans came into contact with Celtic deities, they often interpreted the new deity through existing Roman models in a process known as interpretatio romana. As Gaul was Romanized under the early Empire, Epona's sovereign role evolved into a protector of cavalry. Local Gallic customs and Epona's cult were spread across the Roman Empire by the auxilia, alae, numeri, and equites singulares, military units that were primarily recruited from Gaul, Lower Germany, and Pannonia. Due to the modest nature of the goddess' extant offerings and inscriptions, scholars have suggested that Epona may have retained her rustic qualities and focus on healing and fertility even as she was adopted by the Romans.

Epona's feast day in the Roman calendar was given as December 18 on a rustic calendar from Guidizzolo, Italy, although this may have been only a local celebration. She was incorporated into the Roman imperial cult and invoked on behalf of the emperor as Epona Augusta or Epona Regina ('queen').

==== Epona in Hispania ====
Evidence of Epona's cult has been found as far west as the Roman province of Hispania, in the Iberian Peninsula. The core of the cult was likely centered around Celtiberia, a region populated by Hispano-Celtic speakers that was later absorbed into the Empire. She is attested to in Cantabria and Palencia in modern-day Spain, where she was known as Epane.

Generally, in art from this region, Epona is depicted riding a horse, standing among a herd of horses, or feeding foals. A small stone altar dedicated to the goddess was found in Andújar, Andalusia, likely dating to the late 1st or early 2nd centuries CE. The goddess herself is not depicted, but a mule is carved into the surface. The expansion of her cult outside of Celtiberia and into cities along the Sierra Morena is likely due to the vast network of copper mines in the region; her worshippers likely worked at or owned these mines.Hernández Guerra (2011), pp. 250–251

=== In Britain ===
In the West Country, specifically Padstow and Minehead, the tradition of May Day hobby-horse parades survived into the 20th century; at the end of the festivities in Padstow, the hobby-horse was formerly ritually submerged into the sea. Folklorists have claimed the festival has roots in the ritual worship of Epona. However, there is no firm evidence of the festival existing before the 18th century. A southern Welsh folk ritual called Mari Lwyd (Grey Mare) is still undertaken in December. Some folklorists have likewise claimed the event descends from the veneration of Epona. However, there is no firm evidence to support this claim.

==== Rhiannon ====
In the medieval Welsh collection of stories known as the Mabinogion, the regal figure of Rhiannon rides a white horse, whose slow, effortless gait supernaturally outpaces all pursuit. Wrongly accused of killing her offspring, Rhiannon has to live as a horse for seven years as punishment, offering to carry travellers to the court and telling them her story; she also wears the work-collar of an ass.

She and her son, who is fathered by the sea-god (cf Romano-Greek Poseidon, god of horses and the sea), are sometimes described as mare and foal. Ronald Hutton is skeptical of connections claimed between Epona and Rhiannon; the latter is a much later, literary creation, though it also draws on oral traditions now lost.

== Archaeological evidence ==
The majority of artifacts related to and dedicated to Epona have been found in what was eastern and northeastern Roman Gaul and around the Roman limes in the German Rhineland, which were garrisoned by cavalry. The historian Benoît claimed that the earliest Epona worship occurred in the Roman Danubian provinces, and asserted that she has been introduced to the Gallic limes by horsemen from the east; however, this suggestion is not widely accepted. The extant evidence for Epona's cult and worship primarily consists of votive objects, inscriptions, and small statues typically created from stone or clay. Objects dedicated to Epona are often found around sacred water— specifically wells, springs, and the Moselle— indicating that she was likely seen as a healer.

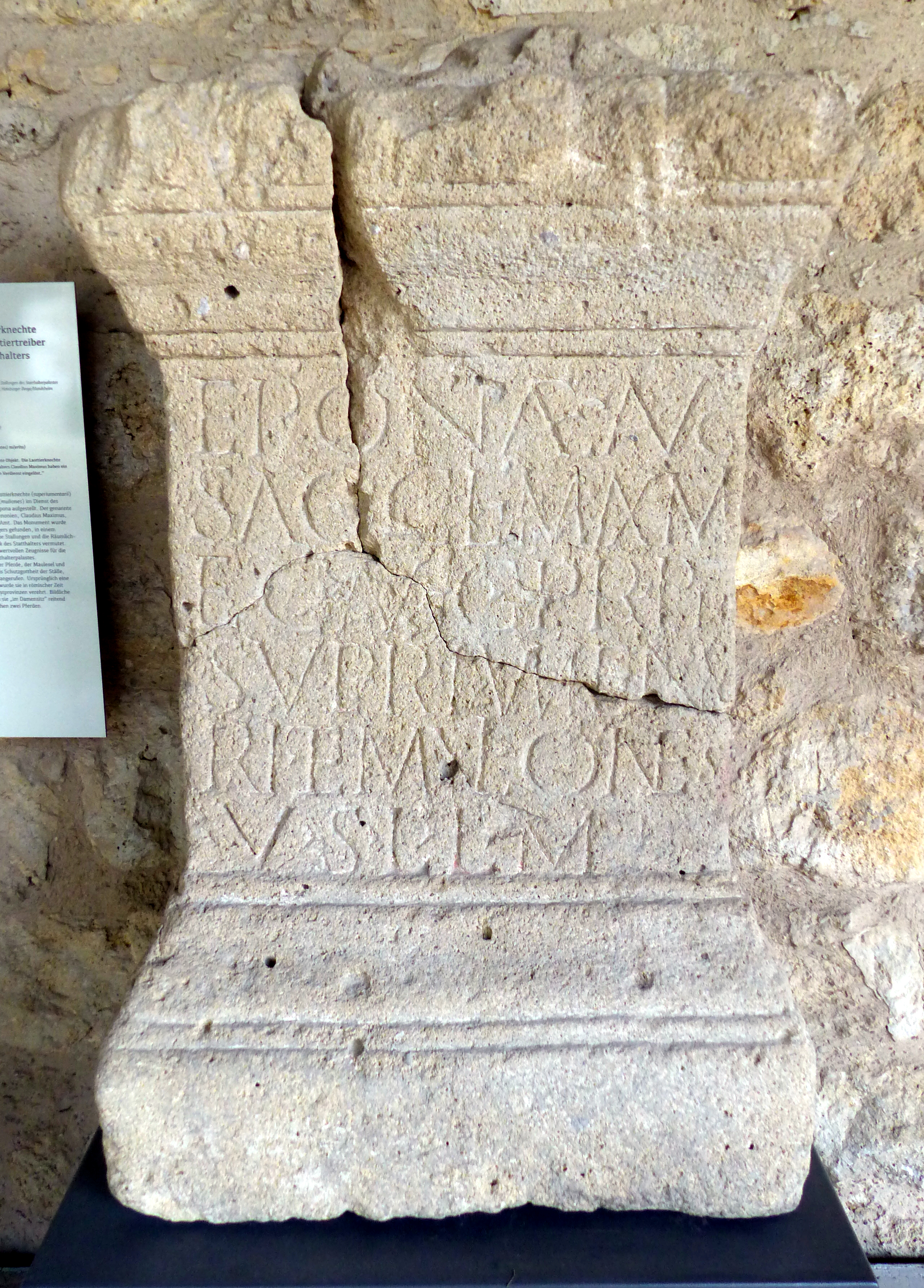
An altar to Epona dedicated by Claudius Maximus, governor of Upper Panniona (150-154 CE)

Although the name 'Epona' is Gaulish, dedicatory inscriptions to Epona are in Latin or, rarely, in Greek. They were made not only by Celts, but also by Germans and other inhabitants of the Roman Empire. One inscription dedicated to Epona from Mainz, Germany, identifies the dedicator as Syrian. Most often, inscriptions were created by a single individual to honor a pledge or vow to the goddess; most individuals were non-high ranking members of the military— specifically the cavalry— and had Romanized names or Roman surnames.

A long Latin inscription from the first century BCE— engraved on a lead sheet and accompanying the sacrifice of a filly and the votive gift of a cauldron— was found in 1887 at Rom, Deux-Sèvres (Roman settlement of Rauranum). Olmsted reads the inscription as invoking the goddess with an archaic profusion of epithets, including: Eponina ('dear little Epona'), Atanta ('horse-goddess'), Potia ('powerful mistress' (compare Greek Potnia)), Dibonia (Latin, the 'good goddess'), Catona ('of battle'), and Vovesia. However, Olmsted's interpretation has not been generally accepted by other scholars; Meid interprets the same inscription as an invocation of the goddess Dibona in vulgar Greek for aid in a romantic dispute.

Two inscriptions mention a temple dedicated to Epona in modern-day Nièvre, France. The temple was apparently installed on the site where the Gallic chieftain Vercingetorix was defeated by Caesar in 52 BCE during the Gallic Wars. Evidence of potential cultic or temple sites have additionally been found in Asse and Elewijt in modern-day Belgium.

=== Stable finds ===
Some Epona artefacts have been found at stable sites, e.g., the inscription at the praetorium of the governor of Apulum in Dacia (present-day Alba Iulia, Romania). There is also the mural painting of a goddess riding sidesaddle on a donkey and carrying a child, in the lararium niche of a stable unearthed at Pompeii (site Regio IX, Ins. 2, nr. 24); she is tentatively identifiable as Epona. (Note: Though not definitively identifiable as Epona, she may be Isis who is connected with asses, and figures in the Golden Ass.)Small images of Epona have been found in Roman sites of stables and barns over a wide territory.

=== Example from Britain ===
A provincial, small (7.5 cm high) Roman bronze of a seated Epona, flanked by an "extremely small" mare and stallion, was found in England. Lying on her lap and on the patera raised in her right hand are disproportionately large ears of grain; ears of grain also protrude from the mouths of the ponies, whose heads are turned toward the goddess. On her left arm she holds a yoke, which curves up above her shoulder, an attribute unique to this bronze statuette. (Note: Identified as a yoke by Catherine Johns 1971; its misidentification as a serpent has led to misleading identification of a "chthonic" Epona.)

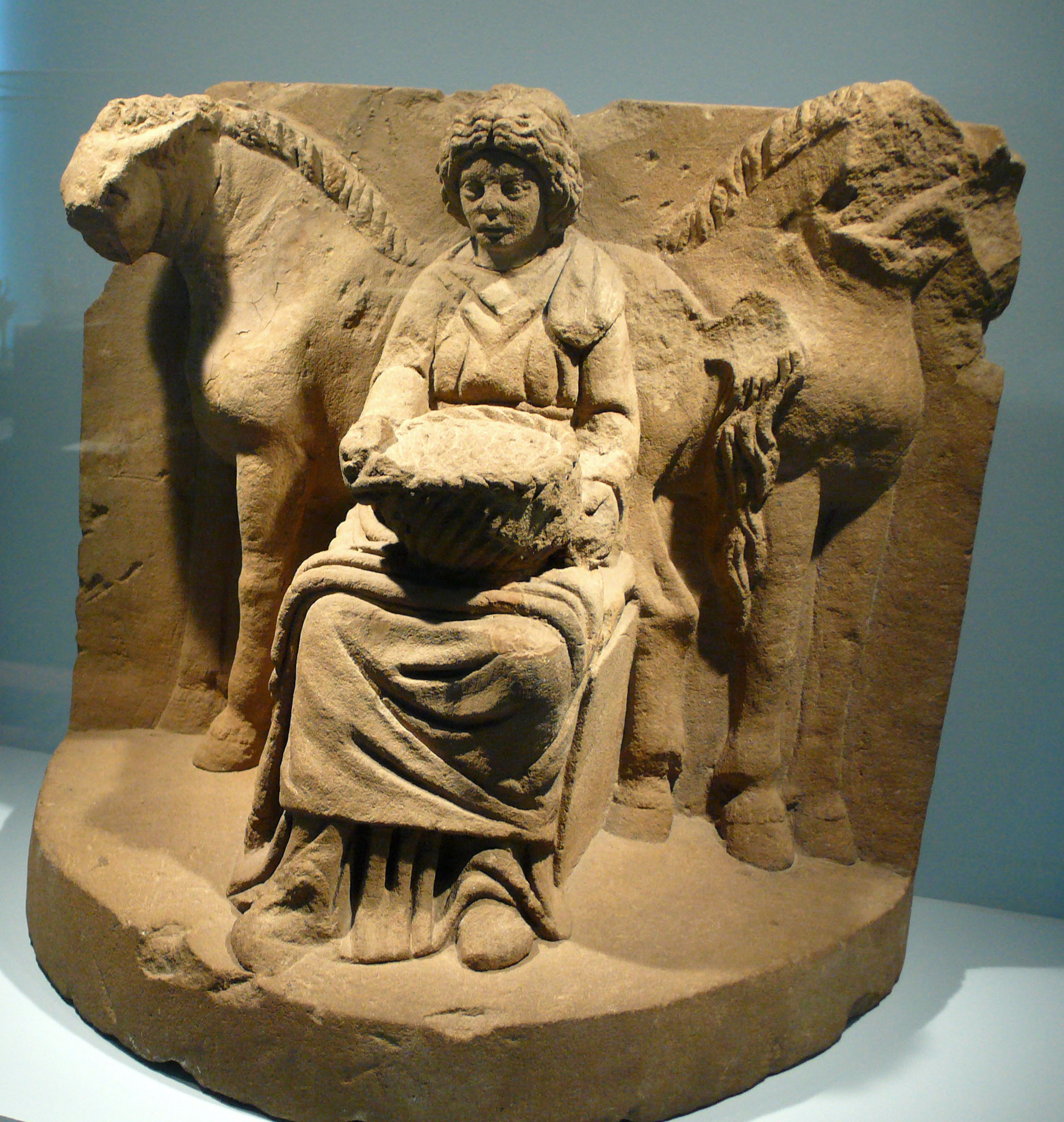
Epona and her horses, from Köngen, Germany, about 200 CE

== Iconography ==
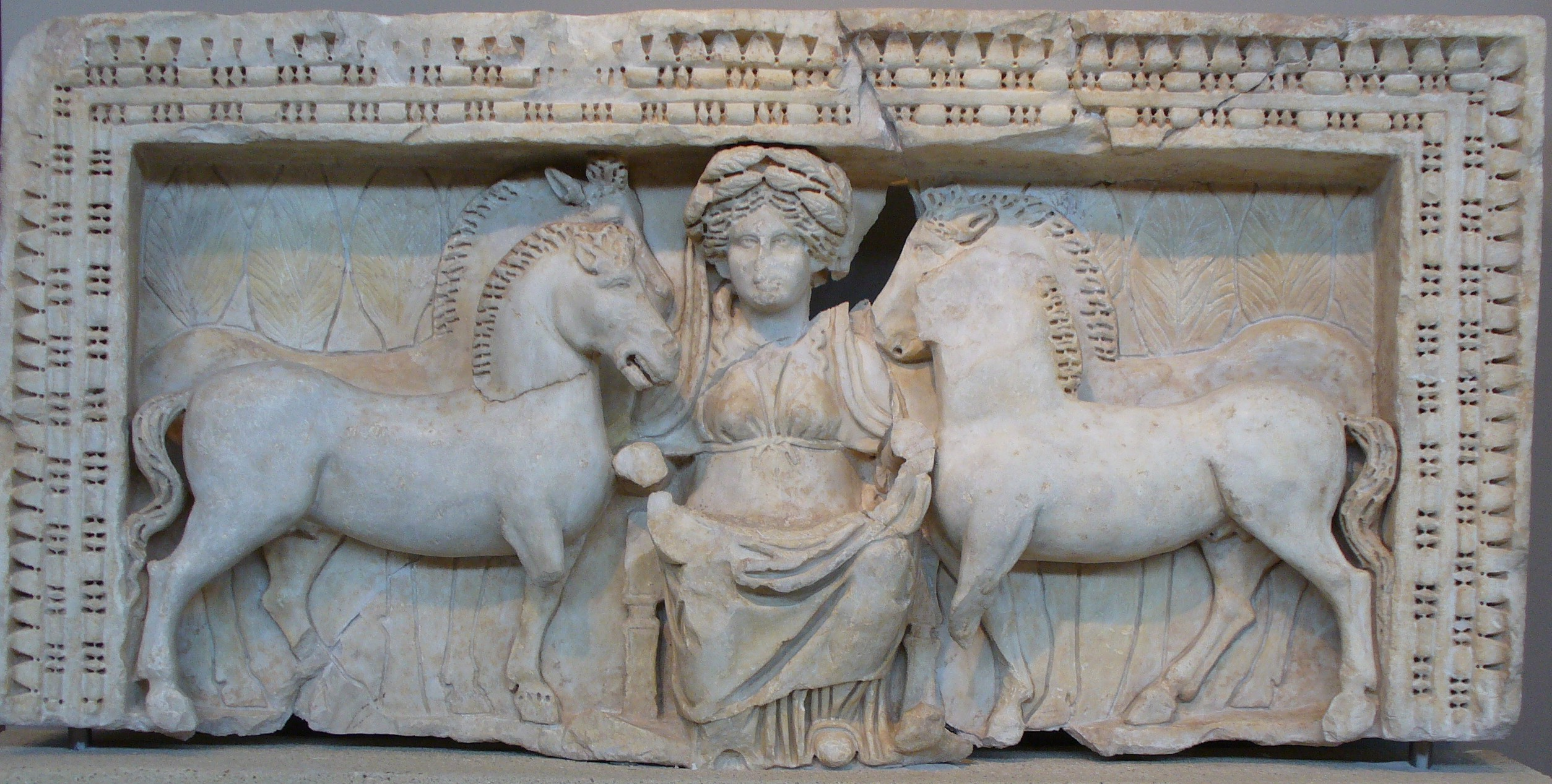
A relief depicting Epona flanked by two pairs of horses from Roman Macedonia. Held at the Archaeological Museum of Thessaloniki

Sculptures of Epona fall into five types, as distinguished by Benoît: riding, standing or seated before a horse, standing or seated between two horses, a tamer of horses in the manner of potnia theron, and the symbolic mare and foal. Most commonly, statues are stone, bronze, or terracotta, and depict the goddess riding sidesaddle. In the Equestrian type, common in Gaul, she is depicted sitting side-saddle on a horse or (rarely) lying on one; in the Imperial type (more common outside Gaul) she sits on a throne flanked by two or more horses or foals.

In addition to horses, Epona is most frequently depicted holding a cornucopia, with bowls or dishes of fruit, bread, or corn also being common; the cornucopia may have been a Roman addition. These objects are also paired with other goddesses of fertility and abundance such as Fortuna and the Matres. She is also sometimes associated with birds or dogs; the dog is a symbol of Sucellus, Gallic god of agriculture and wine.

Reliefs and sculptures depicting the goddess have been found in Pannonia, Moesia Inferior, Dacia, and the central Balkans; she is often seated and flanked by two horses, wearing a long-sleeved tunic (chiton) with a belt and himation layered over it. She is also represented on the handle of a silver patera holding a foal and wearing a corona muralis. Her worshippers in this region may have primarily consisted of blacksmiths and miners from Gaul that worked in the area's silver and lead mines. Additionally, Epona may be the unidentified goddess depicted interacting with— often blessing— the Thracian Horseman, an obscure deity worshipped in the region.

== In literature and art ==
In The Legend of Zelda franchise, the main character Link's horse is named Epona. The horse is always shown as a palomino or flaxen chestnut mare with a white mane.

Artist Enya's namesake album of 1987 contains a track titled Epona, as part of the soundtrack of the BBC documentary The Celts.

== Today ==
On Mackinac Island, Michigan, Epona is celebrated each June with stable tours, a blessing of the animals and the Epona and Barkus Parade. Mackinac Island does not permit personal automobiles; the primary source of transportation remains the horse, so celebrating Epona has special significance on this island in the upper midwest. The "Feast of Epona" involves the blessing of horses and other animals by a local churchman.

Epona is also worshipped today by neo-druids and other pagans and polytheists.

The Goddess name inspired the name of the EPONA (Energetic Particle Onset Admonitor) instrument on the Giotto spacecraft.

== See also ==
- Horse sacrifice
- White horse (mythology)
