= Hefeydd =

In Pwyll Pendefig Dyfed, the first branch of the Mabinogi, Hefeydd Hen (or Heyfedd the Old) was the father of Rhiannon.

According to legend, Hefeydd Hen tried to force his daughter Rhiannon to be married against her will to Gwawl son of Clud. She met Pwyll of Dyfed at the Mound of Arberth and planned to marry at her father's court in one year and one day. Their marriage was thwarted by Gwawl and his men. The feast was given to Pwyll and his men, but Rhiannon was given to Gwawl to marry in a year and a day. Pwyll then went to Hefeydd's court dressed as a beggar, asking for food. By a trick, Gwawl was captured and he and his men were defeated; forcing Hefeydd to allow Rhiannon to marry Pwyll in his court. Heyfedd Hir (Hir meaning "long" in Welsh, but also referring to distance in time), is mentioned as one of the Seven Knights left to take charge of the Island of Britain when Bran went to rescue his sister in the second branch of the Mabinogi. He is also to be found in the 6th century epic poem Y Gododdin where the word "Hir" is used to describe no less than seven individuals.

Caeawg, the leader, armed was he in the noisy conflict;
His was the foremost part of the advanced division, in front of the hosts.
Before his blades fell five battalions.
Of the men of Deivyr and Brenneich, uttering groans:
Twenty hundred perished in one hour.
Sooner did his flesh go to the wolf, than he to the nuptial feast;
He sooner became food for the raven, than approached the altar;
Before he entered the conflict of spears, his blood streamed to the ground.
It was the price of mead in the hall, amidst the throng.
Hyveidd Hir shall be celebrated as long as there will be a minstrel.

— Y Gododdin, stanza 5
