= Pryderi =

Character of Welsh mythology

- Mabinogi character
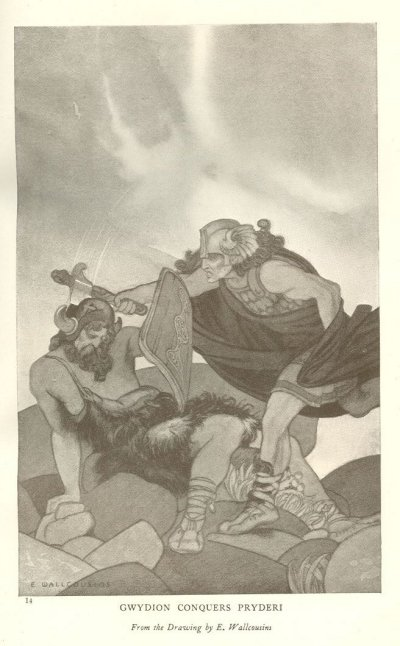
- Pryderi's death in single combat. Image by E. Wallcousins.

In-universe information
- Species: Human
- Gender: Male
- Spouse(s): Cigfa ferch Gwyn Glohoyw
- Parents: Pwyll (father), Rhiannon (mother)
- Family: Manawydan (step-father), Hefeydd (maternal grandfather)

Welsh mythology character
- Found in: Pwyll Pendefig Dyfed, Branwen ferch Llŷr, Manawydan fab Llŷr, Math fab Mathonwy
- Nationality: British (Demetian)

Pryderi fab Pwyll is a prominent figure in Welsh mythology, the son of Pwyll and Rhiannon, and king of Dyfed after his father's death. He is the only character to appear in all Four Branches of the Mabinogi, although the size of his role varies from tale to tale. He is often equated with the divine son figure of Mabon ap Modron, while Jeffrey Gantz compares him to Peredur fab Efrawg, who is himself associated with the continental figure of Sir Percival de Galles.

Ifor Williams speculated that he was once the focal character of the Mabinogi as a whole, although some subsequent scholars disagree with this theory.

Pryderi is described by Jeffrey Gantz as "bold and enterprising, but rash to the point of foolishness." He goes on to say that "his downfall, while pathetic, is not entirely undeserved."

== Role in Welsh mythology ==
=== Birth and early life ===
Pryderi was born in Arberth to Pwyll, Lord of Dyfed, and Rhiannon, daughter of Hyfaidd Hen. On the night of his birth, he disappeared while in the care of six of Rhiannon's ladies-in-waiting. To avoid the king's wrath, they smeared dog's blood onto a sleeping Rhiannon, claiming that she had committed infanticide and cannibalism by eating her child.

Teyrnon, Lord of Gwent Is Coed, had a mare which gave birth each year but whose foals had all disappeared. Teyrnon watched his stables and saw a mysterious clawed beast coming to take the foal; Teyrnon cut off the beast's arm and found the child outside the stable. He and his wife claimed the boy as their own and named him Gwri Wallt Euryn (English: Gwri of the Golden hair), for "all the hair was as yellow as gold."

The child grew to adulthood at a superhuman pace and, as he matured, his likeness to Pwyll grew more obvious; and eventually Teyrnon realised Gwri's true identity. The boy was eventually reunited with Pwyll and Rhiannon and was renamed Pryderi. From then on, he was fostered by Pendaran Dyfed and was "brought up carefully, as was proper, until he was the most handsome lad, and the fairest, and the most accomplished at every worthy feat in the kingdom."

After his father's death, Pryderi became ruler of the seven cantrefi of Dyfed and set about expanding his territories by conquering Ystrad Tywi and Ceredigion. He was occupied with this conquest until he chose to take a wife, eventually marrying Cigfa, the daughter of Gwyn Gohoyw. He also succeeded in amalgamating the seven cantrefi of Morgannwg into his kingdom, although the conquest itself is not referenced in any texts.

=== The Assembly of Branwen and Matholwch ===
Branwen, sister of Bendigeidfrân (Brân the Blessed), king of Britain, is given in marriage to Matholwch, king of Ireland. Branwen's half-brother Efnisien, angry that he was not consulted, insults Matholwch by mutilating his horses, but Bendigeidfrân gives him compensation in the form of new horses and treasure, including a magical cauldron which can restore the dead to life. After returning to Ireland Matholwch and Branwen have a son, Gwern, but Efnisien's insult continues to rankle among the Irish and Branwen is banished to the kitchen and beaten every day. Branwen trains a starling to take a message to Bendigeidfrân, who raises a vast host and goes to war against Ireland. Pryderi accompanies him.

The British army crosses the Irish Sea in ships, but Bendigeidfrân is so huge he wades across. The Irish offer to make peace and build a house big enough to entertain Bendigeidfrân but hang a hundred bags inside, supposedly containing flour but actually containing armed warriors. Efnisien, suspecting a trick, reconnoitres the hall and kills the warriors by crushing their heads inside the bags. Later, at the feast, Efnisien, again feeling insulted, throws Gwern on the fire and fighting breaks out. Seeing that the Irish are using the cauldron to revive their dead, Efnisien hides among the corpses and destroys the cauldron, sacrificing himself in the process.

Pryderi is one of only seven men to survive the violent battle. He and his companions are told by the mortally wounded Bendigeidfrân to cut off his head and to return it to Britain. The survivors stay in Harlech, where they are entertained by Bendigeidfran's head, which continues to speak. They later move on to Gwales (often identified with Grassholm Island off Dyfed) where they live for eighty years without perceiving the passing of time. Eventually, Heilyn ap Gwyn opens the door of the hall facing Cornwall and the sorrow of what had befallen them returns. As instructed they take the now silent head to the Gwynfryn, the "White Hill" (thought to be the location where the Tower of London now stands), where they bury it facing France so as to ward off invasion.

=== Return to Britain ===
Pryderi and Rhiannon's imprisonment. From Tales of the Enchanted Islands of the Atlantic, Thomas Wentworth Higginson. Image by Albert Herter.

Pryderi invites Manawydan, Bendigeidfran's brother and a fellow survivor, to live with him in Dyfed, arranging for him to marry his widowed mother Rhiannon. Soon after, Pryderi, Cigfa, Manawydan and Rhiannon ascend a magical hill and, when they descend, Dyfed had turned into a barren wasteland with no inhabitants. Pryderi and Manawydan travel to England to make a living from various trades, but were forced to leave one town after another to avoid conflicts with other tradesmen who resented their superior skills.

Returning to Dyfed, Manaywdan and Pryderi go hunting and, coming across a white boar, follow it to a huge, towering fort. Against Manawydan's advice, Pryderi enters the fort and is drawn towards a beautiful golden bowl. Upon touching the bowl, his feet stick to the floor, his hands stick to the bowl and he loses the power of speech. Manawydan waits in vain for his return before giving news of his disappearance to Rhiannon. Chiding her husband for his poor companionship, Rhiannon too enters the fort and suffers the same fate as her son. In a "blanket of mist", Pryderi, Rhiannon and the fort itself, vanish.

Some time later, Manawydan's cunning frees them from their imprisonment. It is revealed that the catalyst of their suffering was the enchanter Llwyd ap Cil Coed, who sought revenge for the humiliation of his friend Gwawl ap Clud at the hands of Pwyll and Rhiannon. The enchantment over Dyfed is lifted.

=== Invasion of Gwynedd and Death ===
Some time later, Pryderi receives a number of otherworldly pigs from his father's old ally, Arawn, king of Annwn, which are stolen through trickery by Gwydion, a Venedotian magician and warrior. Declaring war on Gwynedd, Pryderi and his men march north and fight a battle between Maenor Bennardd and Maenor Coed Alun. Both sides suffer heavy losses, but Math fab Mathonwy, king of Gwynedd is victorious and Pryderi is forced to retreat. He is pursued to Nant Call, where more of his men are slaughtered, and then to Dol Benmaen, where he suffers a third defeat.

To avoid further bloodshed, it is agreed that the outcome of the battle should be decided by single combat between Gwydion and Pryderi. The two contenders meet at a place called Y Velen Rhyd in Ardudwy, and "because of strength and valour and magic and enchantment", Gwydion triumphs and Pryderi is killed. The men of Dyfed retreat back to their own land, lamenting over the death of their lord.

=== Appearances in other texts ===
The Welsh Triads name Pryderi as one of the 'Three Powerful Swineherds of the Island of Britain', referring to an occasion on which he guarded the pigs of his foster-father, Pendaran Dyfed at Glyn Cuch. An obscure reference is also made of Pryderi and his father in the cryptic early medieval poem Preiddeu Annwfn:

"bu kyweir karchar gweir yg kaer sidi
trwy ebostol pwyll a phryderi.
Neb kyn noc ef nyt aeth idi.
yr gadwyn trom las kywirwas ae ketwi.
A rac preidu annwfyn tost yt geni.
Ac yt urawt parahawt yn bardwedi."

This section of the poem suggests an enmity between Pryderi and a certain Gweir ap Gwystyl, who has been imprisoned in an otherworldly fortress through the "ebestol" of Pwyll and Pryderi. The exact meaning of the word "ebestol" is unclear, but has been variously translated as "epistle", tales", "account", "spite" and "lies."

Pryderi is named once in the Welsh Triads, as one of the three powerful swineherds while the Stanzas of the Graves refer to his final resting place as: "Aber Gwenoli...where the waves beat against the land." The Book of Taliesin poem Song before the sons of Llyr also mentions Pryderi and, as in other texts, associates him both with Manawydan fab Llyr and with the otherworldly fortress of Caer Sidi:

Complete is my chair in Caer Sidi,
No one will be afflicted with disease or old age that may be in it.
It is known to Manawyd and Pryderi.
Three utterances, around the fire, will he sing before it,
And around its borders are the streams of the ocean.
And the fruitful fountain is above it,
Is sweeter than white wine the liquor therein.

The character is also referred to in the works of a number of bards, including Einion fab Gwalchmai, Howel Foel ap Griffri and Cynddelw Brydydd Mawr. The famous fourteenth century poet Dafydd ap Gwilym referred to Dyfed as Pryderi Dir (The Land of Pryderi.)

The children's fantasy series The Chronicles of Prydain features a character named King Pryderi. The character appears in the final book of the series, The High King. King Pryderi is a powerful monarch and warlord who betrays his liege lord, High King Math son of Mathonwy, and the House of Don, to side with Arawn Death-Lord. However, King Pryderi succumbs to his pride and ambition. When he ventures to Caer Dallben in an attempt to murder Dallben the enchanter and steal the Book of Three, he is killed by an enchantment protecting the book.

Regnal titles
Preceded by Pwyll	Mythological Lord of Dyfed; End of First Branch–Fourth Branch	Unknown
