= Agesilaus (disambiguation) =

Agesilaus (Ancient Greek: Ἀγησίλαος) may refer to:

- Agesilaus I (r. c.815–c.785 BC), Agiad king of Sparta
- Agesilaus II (r. 400–360 BC), Eurypontid king of Sparta, brother of Agis II
- Agesilaus (general), brother to Agis III, Eurypontid king of Sparta (r. 338–331 BC)
- Agesilaus (statesman), ephor in 242 BC, also uncle of Agis IV, king of Sparta (r. 244–241 BC)
- Agesilaus (historian), an ancient Greek historian
- Agesander (Hades), an epithet of the Greek god Hades, sometimes rendered as "Agesilaus"
- Agesilaus (Xenophon), biographical work about Agesilaus II written by Greek historian Xenophon
