= Protector of the Horses =

Protector of the Horses could refer to:

- A title given to Sun Wukong in the 16th-century Chinese novel Journey to the West.
- Epona, the Gallo-Roman goddess of horses
