= Horse sacrifice =

Type of animal sacrifice

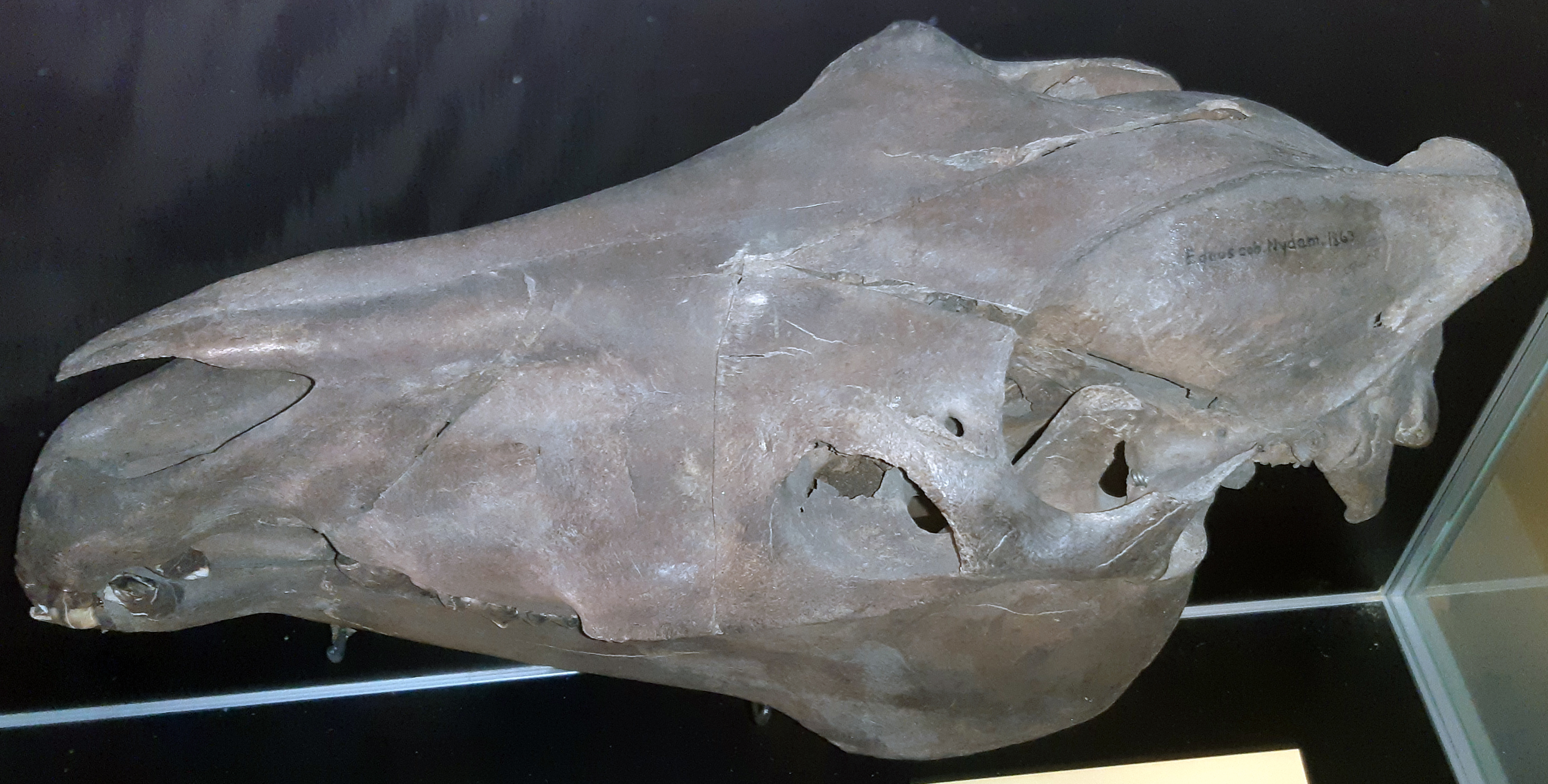
Skull of a horse sacrificed by multiple sword blows during the Iron Age (400 AD-500 AD), found in Nydam Engmose, Denmark, at the Zoological Museum, Copenhagen

Horse sacrifice is the ritual killing and offering of a horse, usually as part of a religious or cultural ritual. Horse sacrifices were common throughout Eurasia with the domestication of the horse and continuing up until the spread of Abrahamic religions, or in some places like Mongolia. The practice is rarely observed in some cultures even today.

Many ethnic religions from Indo-European speaking peoples show evidence for horse sacrifice, and comparative mythology suggests that they derive from a purported Proto-Indo-European ritual and common root, though the practice is also observed among non-Indo-European speaking peoples, especially in nomadic societies from the Eurasian steppe.

== Context ==
Horses are often sacrificed in a funerary context, and interred with the deceased, a practice called horse burial. There is evidence but no explicit myths from the three branches of Indo-Europeans of a major horse sacrifice ritual based on a speculated mythical union of Indo-European kingship and the horse. The Indian Aśvamedha is the clearest evidence preserved, but vestiges from Latin and Celtic traditions allow the reconstruction of a few common attributes.

Some scholars, including Edgar Polomé, regard the reconstruction of a purported common Proto-Indo-European ritual as unjustified due to the difference between the attested traditions.

== Mythology ==
The reconstructed myth involves the coupling of a king with a divine mare which produced the divine twins. A related myth is that of a hero magically twinned with a horse foaled at the time of his birth (for example Cuchulainn, Pryderi), suggested to be fundamentally the same myth as that of the divine twin horsemen by the mytheme of a "mare-suckled" hero from Greek and medieval Serbian evidence, or mythical horses with human traits (Bailus and Xanthus), suggesting totemic identity of the hero or king with the horse.

== Comparative rituals ==
=== Vedic (Indian) ===
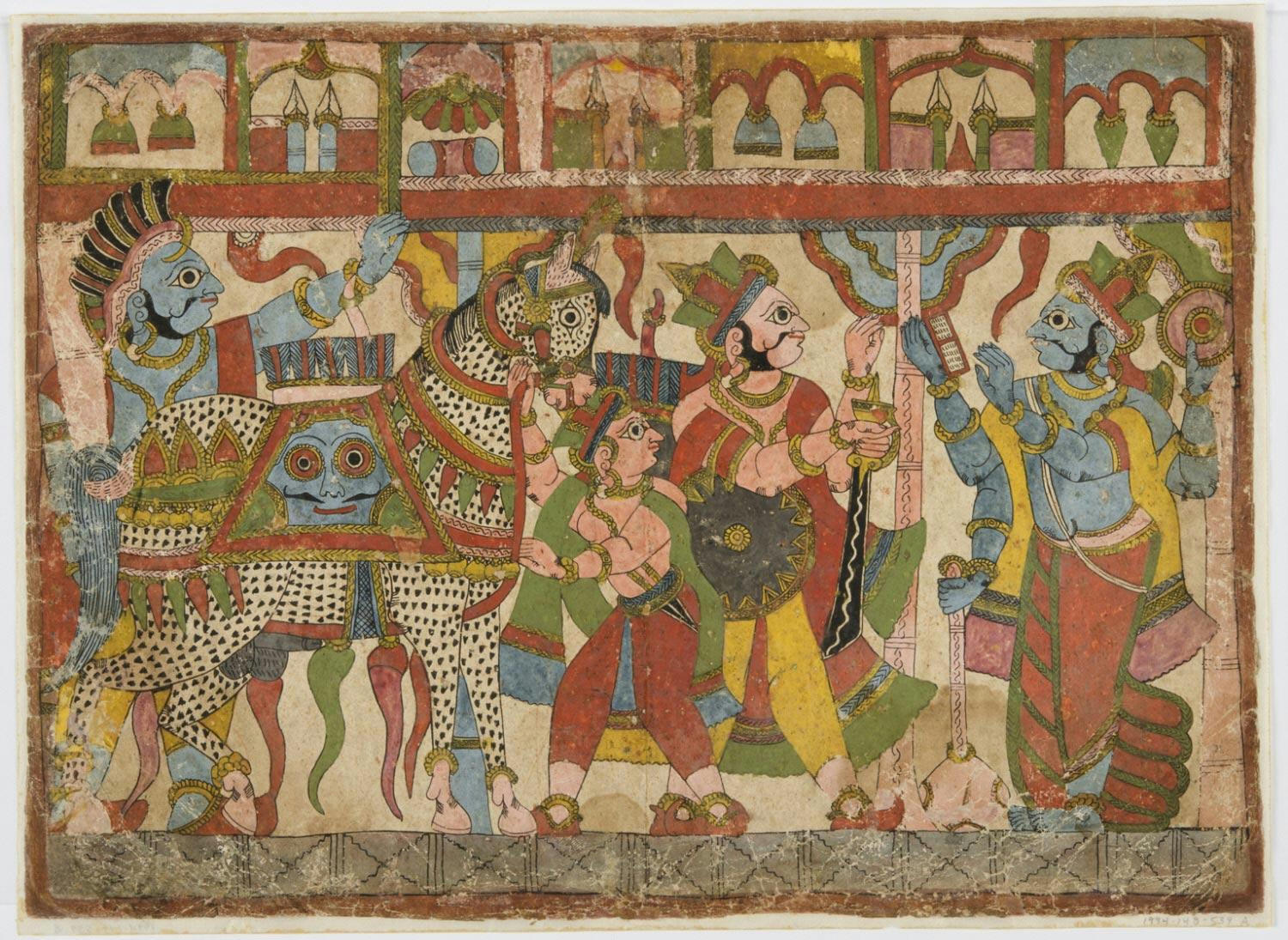
A 19th-century painting, depicting the preparation of army to follow the Ashvamedha sacrificial horse. Probably from a picture story depicting Lakshmisa's Jaimini Bharata

Ashvamedha was a political ritual that was focused on the king's right to rule. The horse had to be a stallion and it would be permitted to wander for a year, accompanied by people of the king. If the horse roamed off into lands of an enemy then that territory would be taken by the king, and if the horse's attendants were killed in a fight by a challenger then the king would lose the right to rule. But if the horse stayed alive for a year then it was taken back to the king's court where it was bathed, consecrated with butter, decorated with golden ornaments and then sacrificed. After the completion of this ritual, the king would be considered as the undisputed ruler of the land which was covered by the horse.

1. the sacrifice is connected with the elevation or inauguration of a member of the Kshatriya varna (warrior class).
2. the ceremony took place in spring or early summer.
3. the horse sacrificed was a stallion which won a race at the right side of the chariot.
4. the horse sacrificed was white-colored with dark circular spots, or with a dark front part, or with a tuft of dark blue hair.
5. it was bathed in water, in which mustard and sesame are mixed.
6. it was suffocated alongside a hornless ram and a he-goat, among other animals.
7. the stallion was dissected along the "knife-paths"—with three knives made from gold, copper, and iron—and its portions awarded to various deities, symbolically invoking sky, atmosphere and earth, while other priests started reciting the verses of Vedas, seeking healing and rejuvenation for the horse.

=== Roman ===
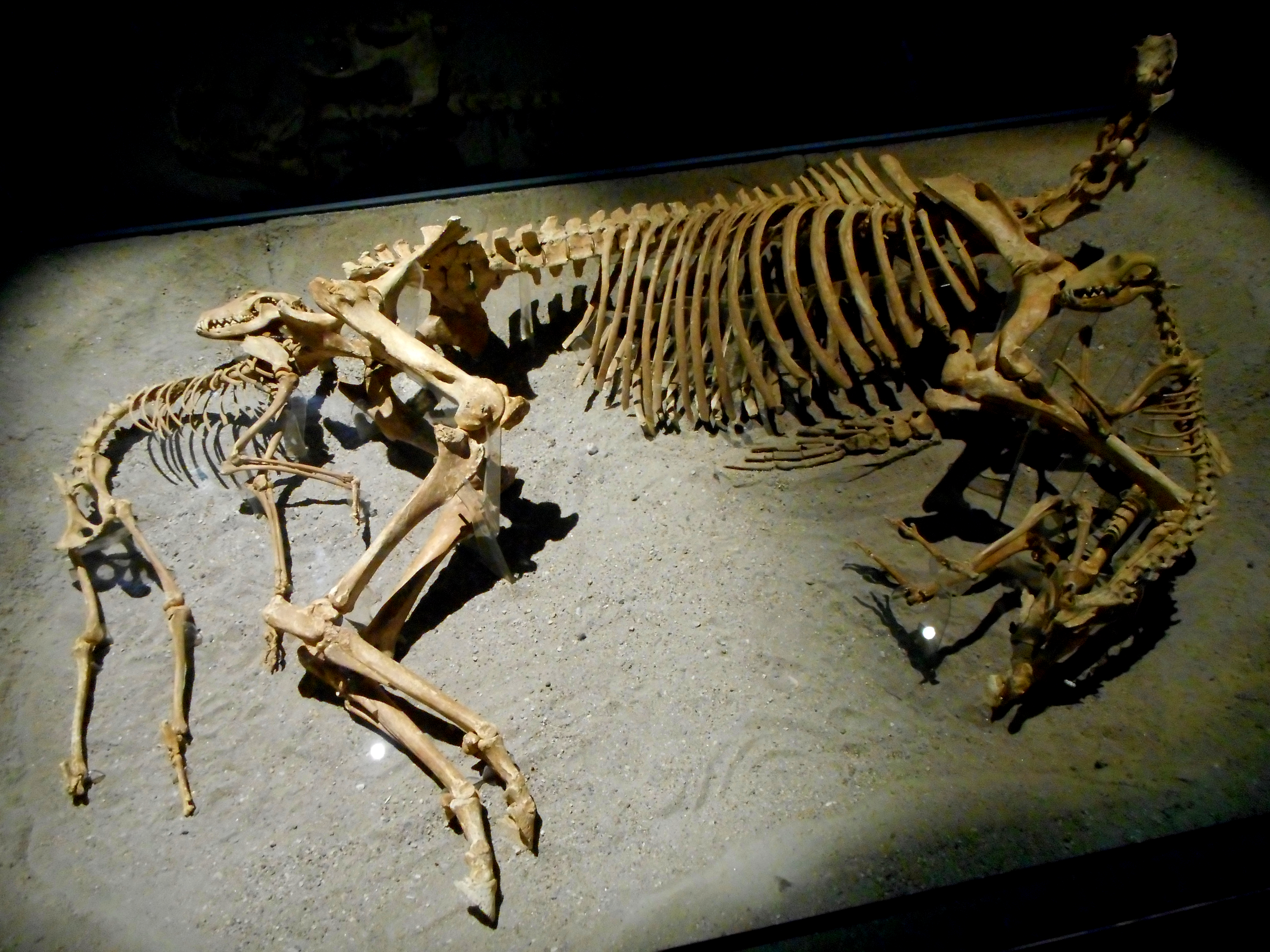
Reconstruction of a sacrificed horse and two dogs (570 AD–600 AD) from Povegliano Veronese

The Roman Equus October ceremony involved:

1. the horse was dedicated to Mars, the Roman god of war.
2. the sacrifice took place on the Ides of October, but through ritual reuse was used in a spring festival (the Parilia).
3. two-horse chariot races determined the victim, which was the right-hand horse of the winning team.
4. the horse is dismembered: the tail (cauda, possibly a euphemism for the penis) is taken to the Regia, the king's residence, while two factions battle for possession of the head as a talisman for the coming year.

=== Irish ===
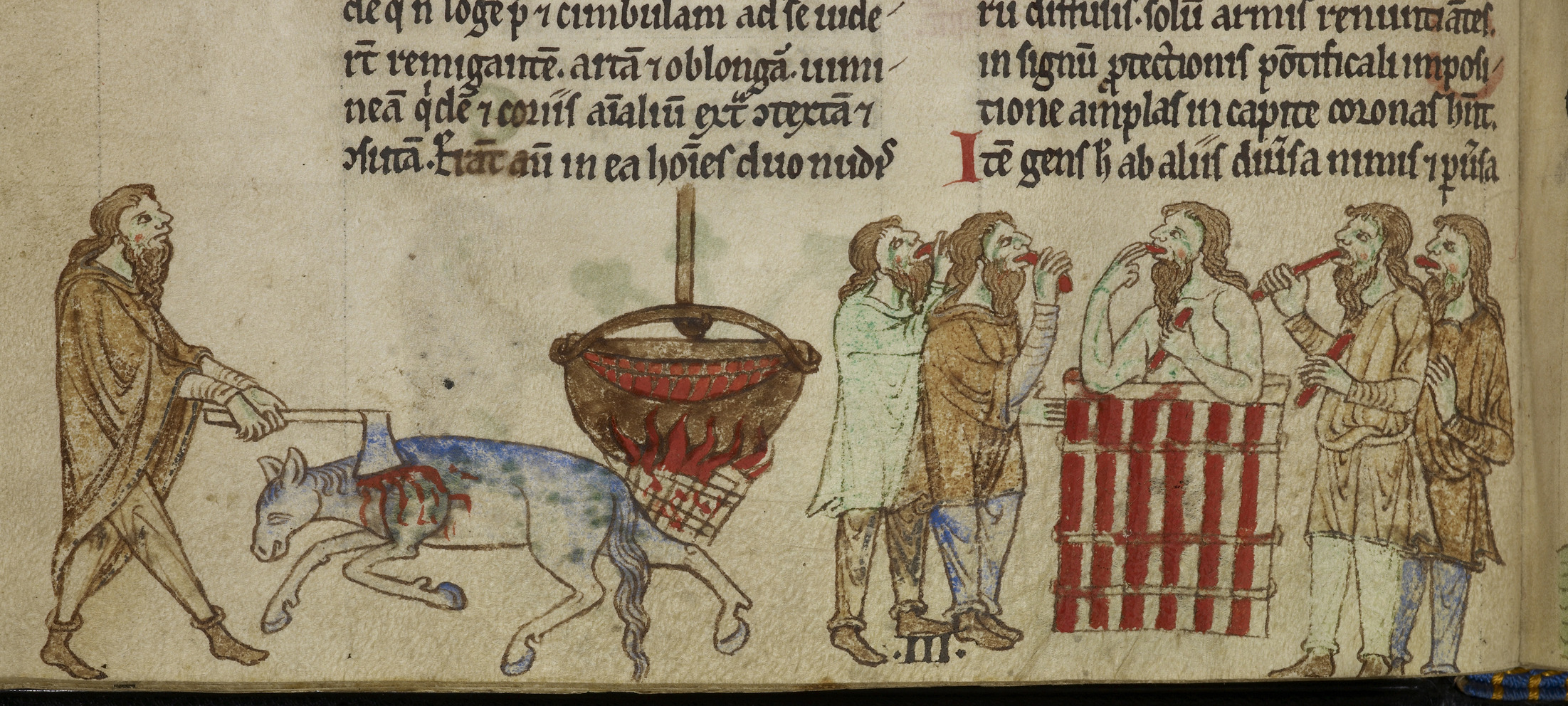
Illustration of the Irish horse sacrifice taken from Topographia Hibernica, c. 1220

Following the 12th-century Anglo-Norman invasion of Ireland, Norman writer Gerald of Wales wrote in his Topographia Hibernica that the Irish kings of Tyrconnell were inaugurated with a horse sacrifice. He writes that a white mare was sacrificed and cooked into a broth, which the king bathed in and drank from:

There is in a northern and remote part of Ulster, among the Kenelcunil, a certain tribe which is wont to install a king over itself by an excessively savage and abominable ritual. In the presence of all the people of this land in one place, a white mare is brought into their midst. Thereupon he who is to be elevated, not to a prince but to a beast, not to a king but to an outlaw, steps forward in beastly fashion and exhibits his bestiality. Right thereafter the mare is killed and boiled piecemeal in water, and in the same water a bath is prepared for him. He gets into the bath and eats of the flesh that is brought to him, with his people standing around and sharing it with him. He also imbibes the broth in which he is bathed, not from any vessel, nor with his hand, but only with his mouth. When this is done right according to such unrighteous ritual, his rule and sovereignty are consecrated.

This has been seen as propaganda meant to paint the Irish as a barbaric people and thus justify Anglo-Norman conquest. However, there may be some truth in the account, because there are mentions of similar horse sacrifices associated with kingship in India (the ashvamedha) and Scandinavia.

=== Germanic ===
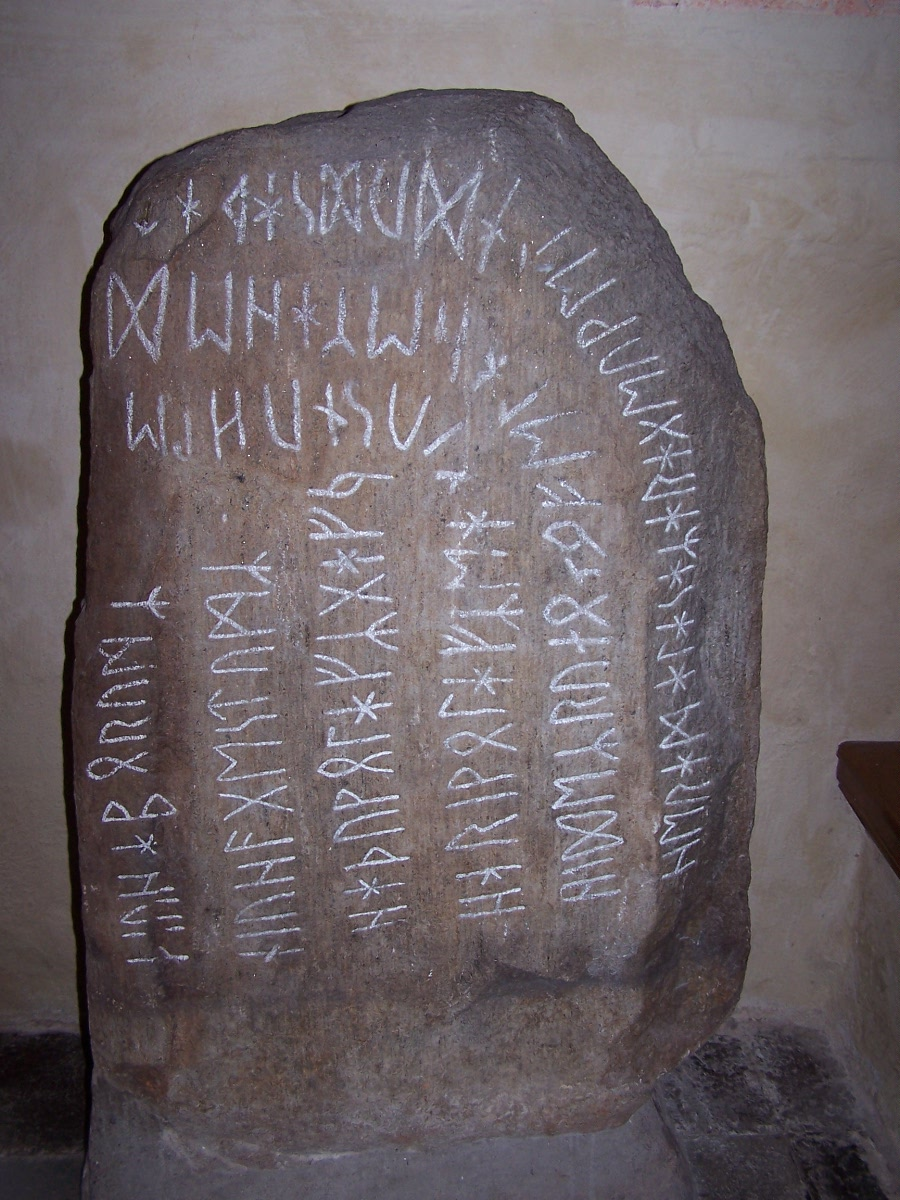
The Stentoften Stone, bearing a runic inscription that likely describes a blót of nine he-goats and nine male horses bringing fertility to the land

Horse sacrifice played a central role in Germanic paganism, with the meat typically being eaten afterwards. The most detailed account of a blót of a horse is given in the saga of Hákon the Good in Heimskringla in which horses and cattle are killed and their blood collected to be sprinkled over the walls of the hof, while their meat is cooked for the attendants. This is consistent with archaeological finds dating to the Early Medieval Period from England and Scandinavia showing deposits of horses that have been eaten.

== Archaeology ==
The primary archaeological context of horse sacrifice are burials, notably chariot burials, but graves with horse remains reach from the Eneolithic well into historical times. Herodotus describes the execution of horses at the burial of a Scythian king, and Iron Age kurgan graves known to contain horses number in the hundreds. There are also frequent deposition of horses in burials in Iron Age India. The custom is by no means restricted to Indo-European populations, but is continued by Turkic tribes.

== See also ==
- Animal sacrifice
- Domestication of the horse
- Epona
- Horse worship
- Horse burial
- Kurgan hypothesis
- Parilia
- Proto-Indo-European religion
