= Teyrnon =

In Welsh tradition, Teyrnon Twryf Lliant is the lord of the Kingdom of Gwent and the foster father of the divine son, Pryderi. He appears most prominently in Pwyll Pendefig Dyfed, the first of the Four Branches of the Mabinogi, but also features briefly in the early tale on the Matter of Britain, Culhwch and Olwen, as a knight of King Arthur. The name Teyrnon is widely acknowledged as deriving from the Common Brittonic *tigernonos, "great lord".

== Role ==
A son is born in Arberth to Pwyll, Lord of Dyfed, and Rhiannon, daughter of Hyfaidd Hen. On the night of his birth, the child disappears while in the care of six of Rhiannon's ladies-in-waiting. To avoid the king's wrath, they smear dog's blood onto a sleeping Rhiannon, claiming that she had committed infanticide and cannibalism through eating her child.

Teyrnon, meanwhile, owns a mare who gives birth each year but whose foals have all disappeared. He guards his stables and sees a mysterious clawed beast coming to take the foal; Teyrnon cuts off the beast's arm and finds the child outside the stable. He and his wife claim the boy as their own and name him Gwri Wallt Euryn (English: Gwri of the Golden hair), for "all the hair was as yellow as gold."

The child grows to adulthood at a superhuman pace and, as he matures, his likeness to Pwyll grows more obvious and, eventually, Teyrnon realises Gwri's true identity. The boy is eventually reconciled with Pwyll and Rhiannon and is renamed Pryderi. From then on, he was fostered by Pendaran Dyfed and was "brought up carefully, as was proper, until he was the most handsome lad, and the fairest, and the most accomplished at every worthy feat in the kingdom."

Pwyll agrees to maintain both Teyrnon and his lands until the day he dies in gratitude. Teyrnon and his wife return to Gwent, amidst "gladness and rejoicing". He is offered many fine treasures but refuses them.
