= Adar Rhiannon =

Story

In the earliest prose stories in Britain in the Mabinogi, the Adar Rhiannon; "birds of Rhiannon", are specifically three magical birds, whose song can "wake the dead and lull the living to sleep". They also have a non-rational effect on space as they can be remote but seem very near. They are connected with Rhiannon the Queen of Dyfed who is thought to be a British euhemerized horse goddess, so part of Welsh mythology. The Adar Rhiannon were demanded by the giant Ysbaddaden Bencawr as a marriage task for Culhwch to complete. The giant wanted the Birds to soothe him as he faced his last night of life, prophesied as the consequence of his daughter's wedding.

== The two British sources ==
In the early native British Arthurian tale from Wales, Culhwch and Olwen, Culhwch ac Olwen, the hero Culhwch ap Cilydd seeks the beautiful Olwen, daughter of the giant chief, Ysbaddaden Bencawr as his bride. A prophecy has foretold that Ysbadadden will die on his daughter's wedding night. The giant therefore sets Culhwch and his companions a number of impossible tasks to complete before he will bestow his daughter. One of the tasks is to bring him the birds of Rhiannon, to entertain Ysbaddaden on the night before his death. The birds are retrieved, although the tale does not explain how. An earlier and fuller version of the tale may have elaborated on this.

The Adar Rhiannon are also mentioned in the second branch of the Mabinogi, the tale of Branwen ferch Llŷr. Following a cataclysmic war against the Irish, the fatally wounded British king Bendigeidfran orders his seven surviving men to decapitate him. They are then to take his head to the White Tower of London to bury it as a national protection. Before setting off, the Seven Survivors feast at Harlech for seven enchanted years, regaled by the three Birds of Rhiannon. These are specifically named in the text, before and after the event, as the birds of Rhiannon (see the very last lines of Branwen for the last reference).

"As soon as they began to eat and drink, three birds came and sang them a song, and all the songs they had heard before were harsh compared to that one. They had to gaze far out over the sea to catch sight of the birds, yet their song was as clear as if the birds were there with them. And they feasted for seven years.
