= Pwyll Pendefig Dyfed =

Medieval Welsh literature

- "Pwyll, Prince of Dyfed"
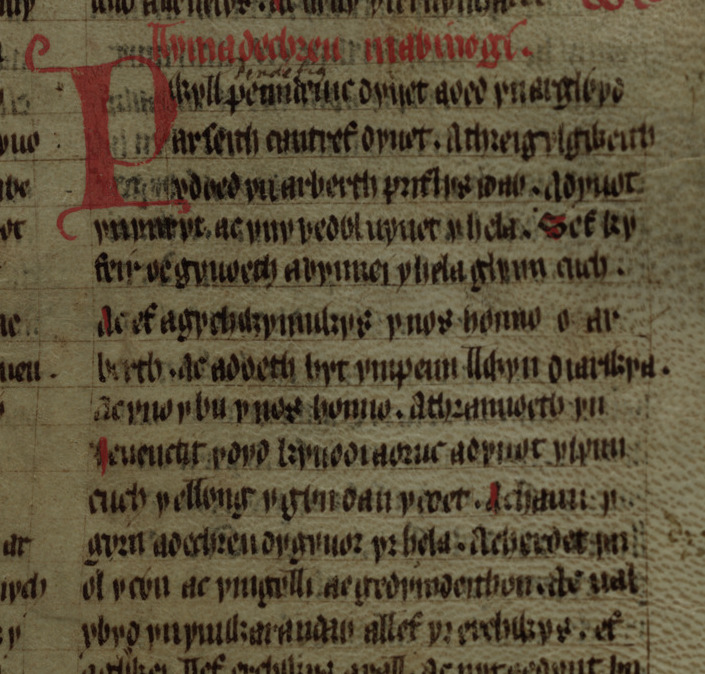
- The opening few lines of the Mabinogi, from the Red Book of Hergest, scanned by the Bodleian Library
- Author(s): Unknown, generally believed to be a scribe from Dyfed.
- Language: Middle Welsh
- Date: Earliest manuscript dates to 14th century; tale believed to be much older.
- Genre: Welsh mythology
- Subject: First branch of the Mabinogi. The reign of Pwyll, Prince of Dyfed and the birth of Pryderi.
- Setting: Kingdom of Dyfed, Annwn
- Personages: Pwyll, Rhiannon, Pryderi, Arawn, Teyrnon, Gwawl, Hyfaidd Hen

Pwyll Pendefig Dyfed, "Pwyll, Prince of Dyfed," is a legendary tale from medieval Welsh literature and the first of the Four Branches of the Mabinogi. It tells of the friendship between Pwyll, prince of Dyfed, and Arawn, lord of Annwn (the Otherworld), of the courting and marriage of Pwyll and Rhiannon and of the birth and disappearance of Pryderi. This branch introduces a number of storylines that reappear in later tales, including the alliance between Dyfed and Annwn, and the enmity between Pwyll and Gwawl. Along with the other branches, the tale can be found in the medieval Red Book of Hergest and White Book of Rhydderch.

== Synopsis ==
Whilst hunting in Glyn Cuch, Pwyll, prince of Dyfed becomes separated from his companions and stumbles across a pack of hounds feeding on a slain stag. Pwyll drives the hounds away and sets his own hounds to feast, earning the anger of Arawn, lord of the otherworldly kingdom of Annwn. In recompense, Pwyll agrees to trade places with Arawn for a year and a day, taking on the lord's appearance and takes his place at Arawn's court. At the end of the year, Pwyll engages in single combat against Hafgan, Arawn's rival, and mortally wounds him with one blow and earns Arawn overlordship of all of Annwn. After Hafgan's death, Pwyll and Arawn meet once again, revert to their old appearance and return to their respective courts. They become lasting friends because Pwyll slept chastely with Arawn's wife for the duration of the year. As a result of Pwyll's successful ruling of Annwn, he earns the title Pwyll Pen Annwfn; "Pwyll, head of Annwn".

Some time later, Pwyll and his noblemen ascend the mound of Gorsedd Arberth and witness the arrival of Rhiannon, appearing to them as a beautiful woman dressed in gold silk brocade and riding a shining white horse. Pwyll sends his best horsemen after her, but she always remains ahead of them, though her horse never does more than amble. After three days he finally calls out to her asking her to stop. Rhiannon does so immediately and says she will gladly stop and it would have been better for the horse if he had asked sooner. She then tells him she has come seeking him because she would rather marry him than her fiance, Gwawl ap Clud. They set their wedding day a year after their first meeting and on that day Pwyll sets out for the court of Hyfaidd Hen. At their wedding feast a man shows up and asks to make a request of Pwyll who replies the man may have whatever he asks for. The man then reveals himself as Gwawl ap Clud and asks for Rhiannon and the wedding feast, which Pwyll is obliged to give. Rhiannon, unhappy with this turn of events explains that the feast is hers and not Pwyll's to give away and it has already been promised to the guests and hosts. She explains that after another year an equal feast will be prepared for her and Gwawl ap Clud, and he leaves back to his realm. One year later the day of the feast arrives and now it is Pwyll Pen Annwfn who comes to the wedding feast, in disguise and with an enchanted bag given to him by Rhiannon, to ask for a request. Gwawl ap Clud, being more clever than Pwyll replies that if the request is reasonable he shall have it. Pwyll then asks for only enough food to fill his bag and Gwawl ap Clud complies. The bag being enchanted though, could not be filled and eventually Gwawl ap Clud himself enters the bag to honour his promise and Pwyll closes it and the bag is hung and struck repeatedly by Pwyll's men.

Under the advice of his noblemen, Pwyll and Rhiannon attempt to supply an heir to the kingdom and eventually a boy is born. However, on the night of his birth, he disappears while in the care of six of Rhiannon's ladies-in-waiting. To avoid the king's wrath, the ladies smear dog's blood onto a sleeping Rhiannon, claiming that she had committed infanticide and cannibalism through eating and "destroying" her child. Rhiannon is forced to do penance for her crime.

The child is discovered outside a stable by an ex-vassal of Pwyll's, Teyrnon, the lord of Gwent Is Coed. He and his wife claim the boy as their own and name him Gwri Wallt Euryn (English: Gwri of the Golden hair), for "all the hair on his head was as yellow as gold." The child grows to adulthood at a superhuman pace and, as he matures, his likeness to Pwyll grows more obvious and, eventually, Teyrnon realises Gwri's true identity. The boy is eventually reunited with Pwyll and Rhiannon and is renamed Pryderi, meaning "caution".

The tale ends with Pwyll's death and Pryderi's ascension to the throne.
