= Edgar Fawcett =

American novelist and poet

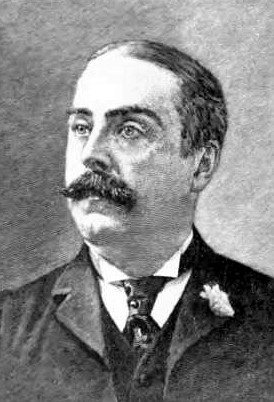
- Born: May 26, 1847; New York City
- Died: May 2, 1904 (aged 56); London
- Occupation: American writer

Edgar Fawcett (May 26, 1847 – May 2, 1904) was an American novelist and poet.

== Biography ==
=== Early life and education ===
Fawcett was born in New York City on May 26, 1847, and spent much of his life there. Educated at Columbia College, he obtained the A.B. there in 1867 and his M.A. three years later. At Columbia, he was a member of the Fraternity of Delta Phi and the Philolexian Society.

=== Career ===
Although successful in his time, his works are mostly forgotten today.

His best known novels, such as Purple and Fine Linen (1873) and New York (1898), were satirical studies of New York high society. Fawcett also wrote a parody of the King Arthur legends entitled The New King Arthur: An Opera Without Music (1885), as well as numerous works for children, such as Short Poems for Short People (1872).

In 1877, his poem "Box" appeared in the Sacramento Daily Union having been reprinted from The Atlantic, where it would appear in the September issue. His volumes of verse included Song and Story (1884) and Songs of Doubt and Dream (1891). His verse was frequently anthologized. "The Man from Mars" was published in the June 1892 issue of Short Stories: A Magazine of Select Fiction.

Stanley R. Harrison's study, entitled Edgar Fawcett, was published in 1972. It lists many unpublished manuscripts sent in for copyright with such titles as "The Man from Mars" and "The Destruction of the Moon," but no trace of most of these beyond the listing seems to exist.

=== Later life, and death ===
Fawcett spent many of the last years of his life in London, where he died on May 2, 1904.

== Bibliography ==
- Asses' Ears (1871)
- Short Poems for Short People (1871)
- Purple and Fine Linen (1873)
- Ellen Story (1876)
- Fantasy and Passion (1878)
- A False Friend (1880)
- Our First Families (1880)
- A Hopeless Case (1880)
- Sixes and Sevens (1881)
- Americans Abroad (1881)
- A Gentleman of Leisure (1881)
- An Ambitious Woman (1883)
- Adventures of a Widow (1884)
- Tinkling Cymbals (1884)
- Rutherford (1884)
- Song and Story (1884)
- The Adventures of a Widow (1884)
- The Buntling Ball (1884)
- Social Silhouettes (1885)
- The New King Arthur (1885)
- Romance and Revery (1886)
- The House at High Bridge (1886)
- The Earl (1887)
- The House at High Bridge (1887)
- The Confessions of Claud (1887)
- Olivia Delaplaine (1887)
- Divided Lives (1888)
- Douglas Duane (1888)
- A Man's Will (1888)
- Miriam Balestier (1888)
- A Demoralizing Marriage (1889)
- The Evil That Men Do (1889)
- Solarion (1889)
- Agnosticism and Other Essays (1889)
- Blooms and Brambles (1889)
- A Daughter of Silence (1890)
- Fabian Dimitry (1890)
- How a Husband Forgave (1890)
- A New York Family (1891)
- A Romance of Two Brothers
- Songs of Doubt and Dream (1891)
- Women Must Weep (1891)
- The Adopted Daughter (1892)
- American Push (1892)
- An Heir to Millions (1892)
- Loaded Dice (1893)
- The New Nero (1893)
- Hartmann the Anarchist (1893)
- Her Fair Fame (1894)
- A Martyr of Destiny (1894)
- A Mild Barbarian (1894)
- Outrageous Fortune (1894)
- The Ghost of Guy Thyrle (1895)
- Life's Fitful Fever (1896)
- A Romance of Old New York (1897)
- Two Daughters of One Race (1897)
- New York (1898)
- The Vulgarians (1903)
- Voices and Visions (1903)
- Later Verses (1903)
- An Innocent Anglomaniac (1904)
- The Pride of Intellect (1904)
- "Actaeon" (1893) (Located on page 422 in The Cosmopolitan, An-Illustrated Monthly Magazine; August 1893) (Volume XV. Number 4)
