= Cigfa =

Character in Welsh mythology

Cigfa ferch Gwyn Glohoyw (Middle Welsh: Kigua) is a minor character in Welsh mythology, the wife of King Pryderi of Dyfed. She is mentioned briefly in the First Branch of the Mabinogi, and appears more prominently in the third. Describing the character, Proinsias Mac Cana writes: "Cigfa strikes one as a slight though effective vignette of a contemporary bourgeois snob while William John Gruffydd hypothesises that the character was a later addition to the tale. John Rhys suggested a connection between Cigfa and the Irish character Ciochba.

== Role in Welsh tradition ==
After ascending to the throne of Dyfed, Pryderi searches for a wife and marries Cigfa, whose ancestry is recorded as "Cigfa, daughter of Gwyn Glohoyw, son of Gloyw Walltlydan, son of Casnar Wledig". A similar lineage can be found in Bonedd y Saint, in which a saint named Mechyll fab Echwys is the grandson of Gwyn Glohoyw and great-grandson of Gloyw Walltlydan. Cigfa herself is not mentioned in the genealogy.

Some time after their marriage, Pryderi leaves Dyfed to fight under Bendigeidfran in Ireland. He is one of only seven warriors to survive the battle, and returns home with Manawydan, rightful king of Britain, whom he marries to his mother Rhiannon. The four friends live happily until they ascend the mound at Gorsedd Arberth and the kingdom turns into a barren wasteland, and all of its inhabitants disappear except for the four members of Pryderi's family.

While out hunting one day, Pryderi follows a white boar and does not return, so his mother Rhiannon goes looking for him. She finds him motionless inside a mysterious building, touching a golden bowl. She tries to free him, but becomes enchanted herself when she puts her hand on the object. Manawydan and Cigfa stay together, the former promising to protect the latter, and finally free their spouses when they capture a mouse that is actually the wife of Llwyd ap Cil Coed, Rhiannon's enemy, and force the magician to lift the curses plaguing their land.
