= Agesilaus (historian) =

Ancient Greek historian

Agesilaus (/əˌdʒɛsəˈleɪəs/; Ancient Greek: Ἀγησίλαος) was a Greek historian who wrote a work on the early history of Italy, fragments of which are preserved in Plutarch's "Parallel Lives", and in Stobaeus' Florilegium.
