= Pwyll =

Welsh hero

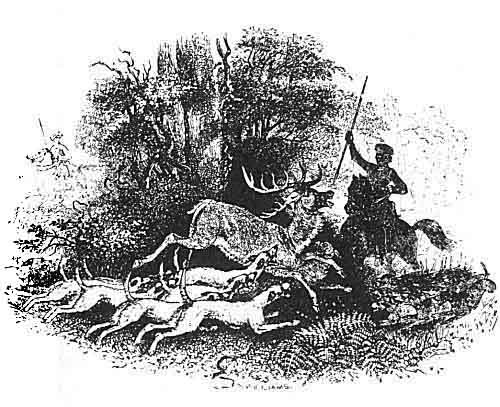
Pwyll, Prince of Dyfed hunting with his hounds

Pwyll Pen Annwn (pronounced [pʊi̯ɬ]) is a prominent figure in Welsh mythology and literature, the lord of Dyfed, husband of Rhiannon and father of the hero Pryderi. With a name meaning "wisdom", he is the eponymous hero of Pwyll Pendefig Dyfed, the first branch of the Four Branches of the Mabinogi, and also appears briefly as a member of Arthur's court in the medieval tale Culhwch ac Olwen. Pwyll, Prince of Dyfed also carries many similarities to the Mabinogi Branwen.

== Origin of Pwyll, Prince of Dyfed ==
This tale is one of a group found in The Mabinogion, one of the earliest known efforts to form a collection of traditional Welsh tales. Such tales, which date back to circa 1325 A.D., were originally passed from person to person and generation to generation orally. The Celtic oral tradition lasted for several centuries and is a possible reason for the abundance of errors and discrepancies found in The Mabinogion as well as other Welsh literature dating back to the fourteenth century or earlier. Professor Sioned Davies of Cardiff University explains the importance of the Celtic oral tradition, in appreciating Welsh literature, this way; "The Mabinogion were tales to be read aloud to a listening audience--the parchment was "interactive" and vocality was of its essence. Indeed, many passages can only be truly captured by the speaking voice."

== Pwyll, Prince of Dyfed ==
While hunting in Glyn Cuch, Pwyll, prince of Dyfed becomes separated from his companions and stumbles across a pack of hounds feeding on a slain stag. Pwyll drives the hounds away and sets his own hounds to feast, earning the anger of Arawn, lord of the otherworldly kingdom of Annwn. In recompense, Pwyll agrees to taking on Arawn's appearance and trade places with him for a year and a day, and takes his place at Arawn's court. At the end of the year, Pwyll engages in single combat against Hafgan, Arawn's rival, and mortally wounds him with one blow, earning Arawn overlordship of all of Annwn. After Hafgan's death, Pwyll and Arawn meet once again, revert to their old appearance and return to their respective courts. They become lasting friends because Pwyll slept chastely with Arawn's wife for the duration of the year. As a result of Pwyll's successful ruling of Annwn, he earns the title Pwyll Pen Annwfn; 'Pwyll, head of Annwn'.

Some time later, Pwyll and his noblemen ascend the mound of Gorsedd Arberth and witness the arrival of Rhiannon, appearing to them as a beautiful woman dressed in gold silk brocade and riding a shining white horse. Pwyll sends his best horsemen after her, but she always remains ahead of them, though her horse never does more than amble. After three days, Pwyll, himself, rides out to meet her and when he cannot catch her, he calls out to her in desperation. Only then does Rhiannon stop. She tells him her name and that she has come seeking him because she would rather marry him than her fiancé, Gwawl ap Clud. She tells him to come to her kingdom one year from that day, with his soldiers, and they will marry. A year after their meeting, Pwyll arrives as promised but accidentally and foolishly promises his beloved Rhiannon to Gwawl (her previous fiancé). This occurs when Gwawl enters the court extremely distraught and sues for a favor of the king. Gwawl plays to the nobility and generosity of Pwyll, as well as his rashness and passion, and Pwyll tells Gwawl that whatever it is that he should ask him, that he (Pwyll) would give it to him. Gwawl of course asks for his fiancée, Rhiannon, which Pwyll, due to his naive promise, could not refuse. It is decided that they should all come back to the kingdom in one year's time for yet another wedding. (Pwyll and Rhiannon were not yet married the first time, the festivities had simply begun but no marriage ceremony had occurred.) Rhiannon devises a plan by which Pwyll might win her back from Gwawl. Pwyll enters the festivities of Gwawl and Rhiannon's wedding dressed as a beggar and asks Gwawl for a bag full of food. Gwawl nobly consents but is tricked when Pwyll forces Gwawl inside the bag and he and his men begin to beat him brutally. Gwawl finally gives in so long as Pwyll will spare his life. Pwyll agrees, having managed to win back Rhiannon through the deceiving and dishonoring of Gwawl.

The men of the land were worried that there would not be an heir to follow Pwyll and advised him to take a second wife. He set a date where this would happen, but before long Rhiannon gave birth to a boy. On the night of his birth, the boy was lost while under the care of six of Rhiannon's ladies-in-waiting. Scared of the punishment, the ladies smear dog's blood onto a sleeping Rhiannon, claiming that she had committed infanticide and cannibalism through eating and "destroying" her child.

Word traveled throughout the land and the nobles requested Pwyll to divorce his wife. But since it was proven that Rhiannon could have children and produce an heir, he did not want to divorce her, rather have her punished for her wrongdoings by the courts. Rhiannon finally decide to accept the punishment given to her. This punishment was to sit outside the city's gates at the mounting block and tell everyone her story for seven years. She also had to offer to carry all guests up to the city on her back for payment of her crimes. This was to be her punishment for her accused crimes of eating her child.

At the same time, Teyrnon, the lord of Gwent Is Coed, had a mare which produced a foal every year but would disappear the night it was born. To solve this problem, he brought the mare into his house and kept watch over it throughout the night. As soon as the colt was born, a great claw came through the window and grabbed the colt. Teyrnon cut off the arm and kept the colt but heard a roar outside and found a baby boy. He and his wife claimed the boy as their own and named him Gwri Wallt Euryn (English: Gwri of the Golden hair), for "all the hair on his head was as yellow as gold". The child grew to adulthood at a superhuman pace and, as he matured, his likeness to Pwyll grew more obvious and, eventually, Teyrnon realised Gwri's true identity. The boy was eventually reunited with Pwyll and Rhiannon and was renamed Pryderi, meaning 'anxiety' or 'care'.

The tale ends with Pwyll's death and Pryderi's ascension to the throne.

== Role in Welsh mythology and English literature ==
The stories of Pwyll greatly influenced the literature and story-telling of England, Ireland and Wales. The oral tradition of the Celts along with the highly fluid nature of society (caused by nearly constant conquest from circa 50 B.A.D. to circa 1500 A.D.) aided in the promiscuous Welsh literary tradition. Shadows of Pwyll's story-lines can be seen in the early Irish tale Fled Bricrend, which in turn greatly influenced the Gawain poet. Shared themes include: "ritualized competitions between two noblemen to win the hand of a lady; ritualized missions or 'errands,' always involving some request; battles in which the combatants are pledged to return to the same place in exactly one year's time; elaborate tricks in which the participants make similar arrangements; repeated chains of events in which the supernatural figures prominently."

Regnal titles
Unknown	Mythological Lord of Dyfed; First Branch	Succeeded by Pryderi fab Pwyll
