= Gwawl =

Welsh mythological figure

In Welsh mythology, Gwawl (Gwawl fab Clud) was the son of Clud, and tricks Pwyll into promising him Rhiannon. She decides to marry Pwyll instead. Nothing is known of his father Clud.

Gwawl, son of Clud, is initially mentioned in the first of the Four Branches of the Mabinogi, when Rhiannon tells Pwyll, Prince of Dyfed, who wishes to marry her, that she is intended for Gwawl. Rhiannon and Pwyll form a plan to free her from her forced marriage to Gwawl and make arrangements for their own marriage in a year's time.

The year passes and it is assumed, if not mentioned, that Gwawl has heard of Rhiannon's pending marriage to Pwyll and has had sufficient time to create a plan so he can marry Rhiannon himself. During the wedding feast at the court of Hyfaidd Hen, Rhiannon's father, Gwawl enters and is described as "a large, noble, brown-haired fellow...wearing silk brocade." Gwawl tricks Pwyll into promising to grant him any reasonable request he should make. Realizing his error, Pwyll has no choice but to honour his promise to Gwawl, which is to give him Rhiannon, the feast, and the current wedding preparations. Pwyll reluctantly agrees to release Rhiannon from their marital alliance, but is unable to give Gwawl the feast and preparations, as they are not his to give away. Gwawl is promised to have Rhiannon's hand in marriage after a year has passed and he thus goes away. Unknown to him, Rhiannon instructs Pwyll about how he can win her back from Gwawl.

After the year is up, Gwawl returns to Rhiannon for the wedding feast and marriage. Pwyll also returns, dressed as a beggar, with a sack that can never be filled until a nobleman stomps down on the bag and orders it to be full. Pwyll enters and asks Gwawl if he can fill his bag with food, to which Gwawl immediately agrees. He becomes irritated when he sees how much food is being put into the sack and asks Pwyll when the sack will be full. Pwyll, as Rhiannon had instructed, says to Gwawl that a strong and powerful noble must trample down the food in the sack and say "enough has been put in here" and then it will be full.

Upon being persuaded by Rhiannon to do the task, Gwawl stands in the bag and Pwyll pulls the bag over Gwawl's head, trapping him within the sack. Pwyll summons his war band and they round up Gwawl's men and put them in chains. Gwawl, himself, is beaten within the bag by Pwyll's men, striking the bag with either their foot or a stick. This is the first account of the game "Badger-in-the-Bag" being played. Gwawl calls out to Pwyll, stating that there is no honor in killing a man trapped in a bag. Pwyll agrees to release Gwawl, if he first promises to never take revenge on them for what has happened. Gwawl eagerly accepts their proposal and is freed from the bag. He tells Pwyll and Rhiannon that he is injured and wounded and thus needs to leave. Gwawl leaves with his men and does not reappear in the other branches, although there is mention of him in the Third Branch of the Mabinogi.
