= Julius Naue =

German painter, illustrator and archaeologist

Julius Naue (17 June 1835 – 14 March 1907) was a German painter, illustrator and archaeologist.

== Career ==
He was born in Köthen. A student of August von Kreling, he came to work for Moritz von Schwind in Munich where he remained until 1866. As an archaeologist, Naue held a presentation on prehistoric swords (Die prähistorischen Schwerter), specifically Bronze Age swords, for the Anthropological Society in Munich in 1884. The "Naue" type of Bronze Age swords is named in his honour. Naue was an autodidact, and published various smaller treatises for which he proceeded to compile in a dissertation at Tübingen University in 1887, Die Hügelgräber zwischen Ammer- und Staffelsee. He also planned a multi-volume work on "The Bronze Age in Upper Bavaria", but only published the first volume in 1894. He died in 1907 in Munich.

=== Notable paintings ===
- Verkündigung Mariae (1862)
- Die nordische Sage (1864)
- Der Krötenring (1865)
- Das Märchen von Kaiser Heinrich I. und der Prinzessin Ilse (1866)
- Das Schicksal der Götter nach der Deutschen Heldensage (1877)
- Helgi und Sigrun (1879)

== Gallery ==
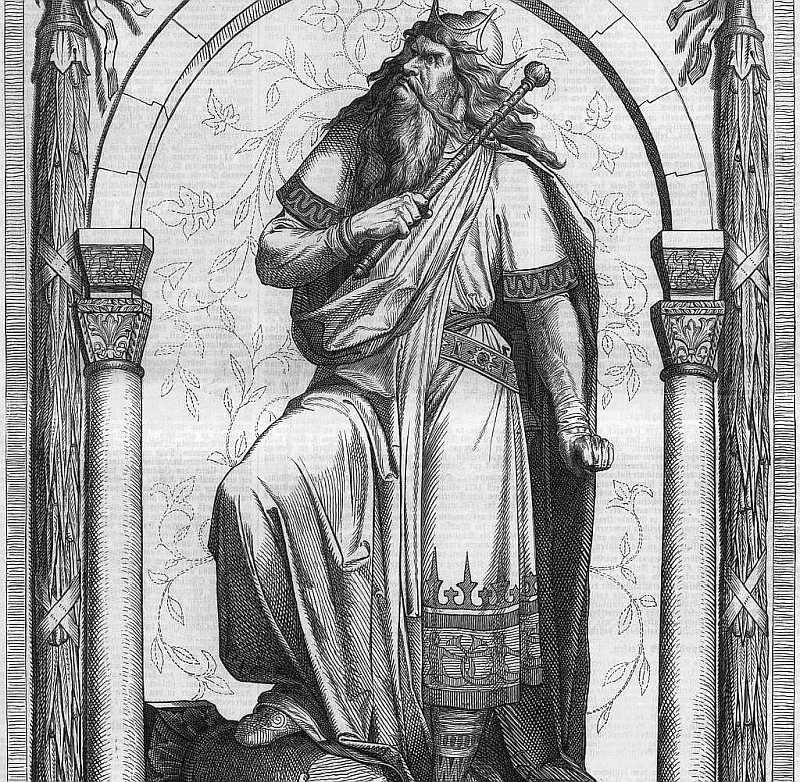
Vandal King Gaiseric (1869)

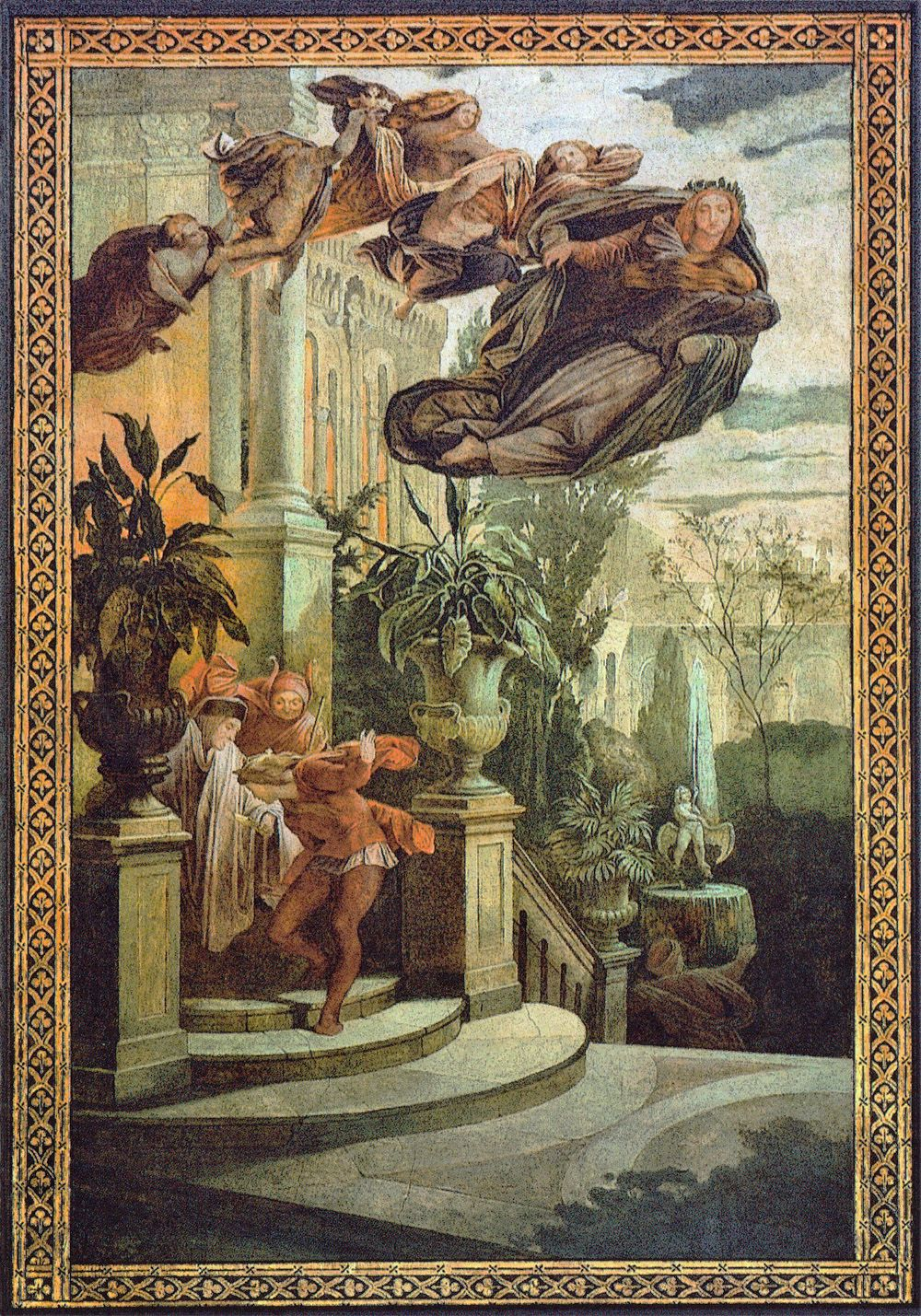
Aschenbrödel

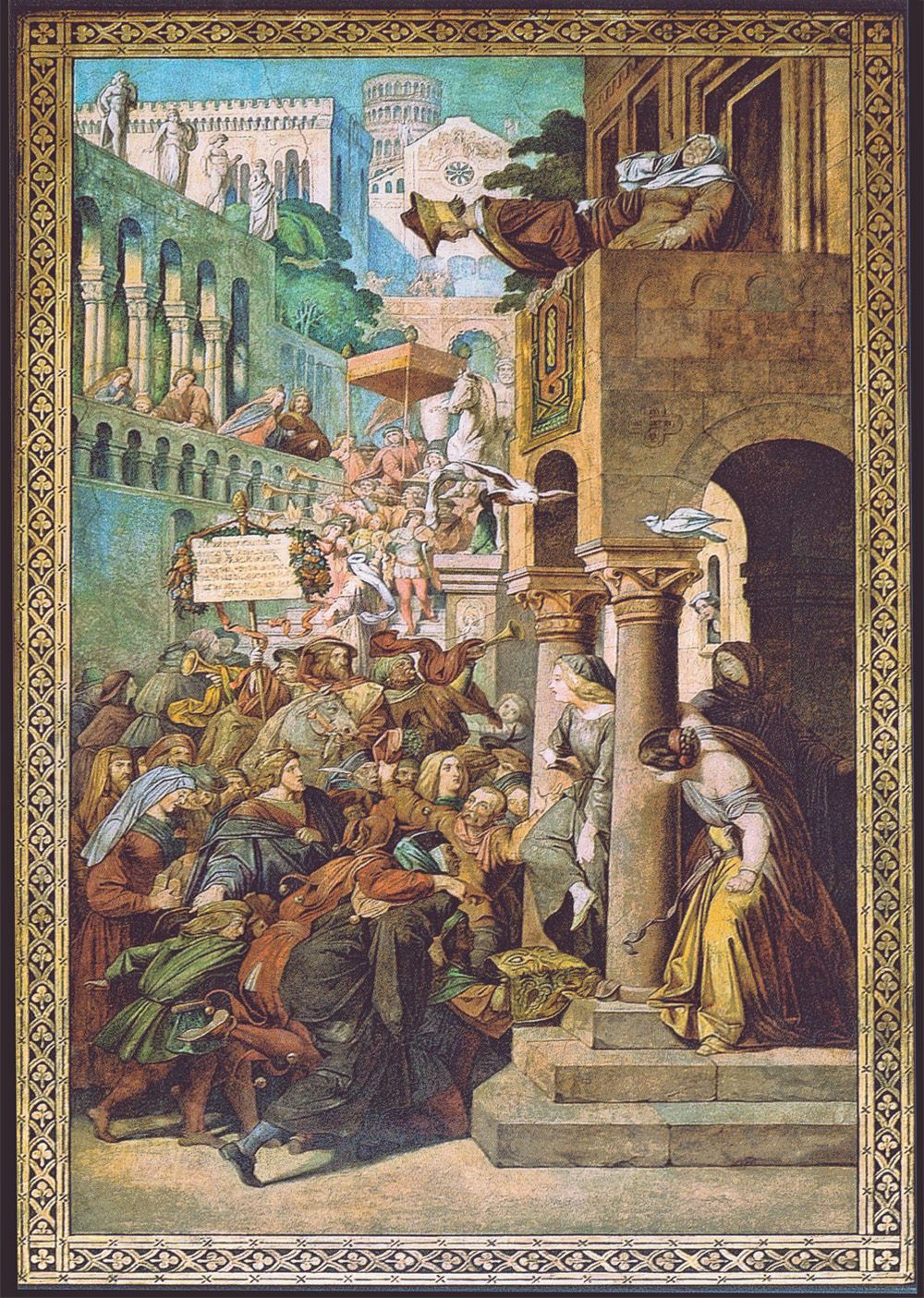
Aschenbrödel

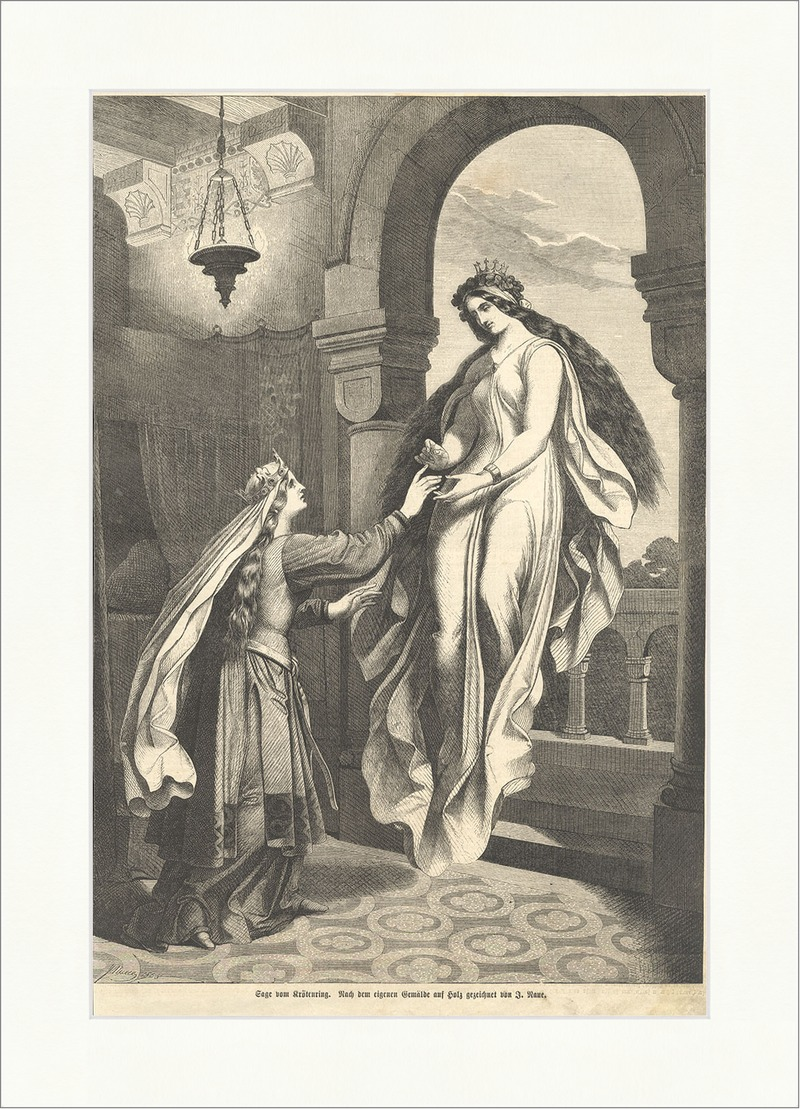
The Toad Ring (1866)

== Publications ==
- Die Hügelgräber zwischen Ammer- und Staffelsee. Stuttgart 1887.
- Naue (J.), 1888a, “Prae-historic and Ethnographic Studies. The Copper Bronze and Iron Weapons of Cyprus”, The Owl. Science, Literature and Art, No. 2, 15 September, 9-15.
- Naue (J.), 1888b, “Prae-historic and Ethnographic Studies. The Copper Bronze and Iron Weapons of Cyprus”, in The Owl. Science, Literature and Art, No. 3, 29 September, 17-23.
- Naue (J.), 1888c, “Prae-historic and Ethnographic Studies. The Copper Bronze and Iron Weapons of Cyprus”, The Owl. Science, Literature and Art, No. 4, 13 October, 25-29.
- Die Bronzezeit in Oberbayern – Ergebnisse der Ausgrabungen und Untersuchungen von Hügelgräbern der Bronzezeit zwischen Ammer- und Staffelsee und in der Nähe des Starnbergersees. Band 1, München, Piloty & Löhle, 1894.
- Die Vorrömischen Schwerter aus Kupfer, Bronze und Eisen. München, Verlag du K. Priv. Kunst. Anstalt Pilot, & Lochk., 1903.
