= Cauldron =

Large kettle

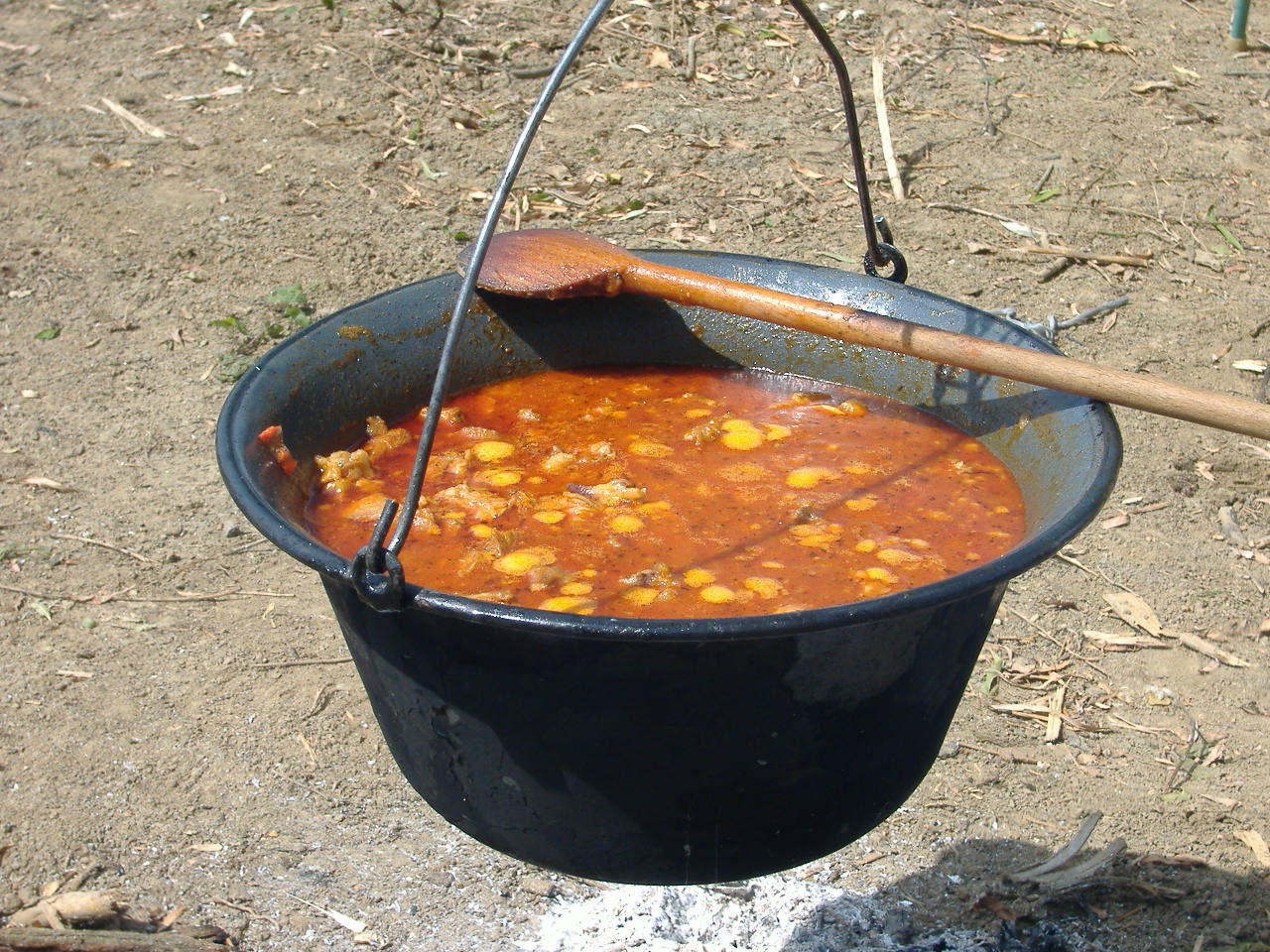
Hungarian goulash in a traditional "bogrács" (cauldron)

A cauldron (or a caldron) is a large pot or kettle used for cooking or boiling, typically over an open fire. It often features a lid, an arc-shaped hanger, and/or integral handles or feet.

While largely replaced by modern cooking vessels in the developed world, the cauldron holds a rich history in religion, mythology, and folklore. In Western culture, it is most commonly associated with witchcraft.

== Etymology ==
The word cauldron is first recorded in Middle English as caudroun (13th century). It was borrowed from Norman caudron (Picard caudron, French: chaudron). It represents the phonetical evolution of Vulgar Latin *caldario for Classical Latin caldārium "hot bath", that derives from cal(i)dus "hot".

The Norman-French word replaces the Old English ċetel (German (Koch)Kessel "cauldron", Dutch (kook)ketel "cauldron"), Middle English chetel. The word "kettle" is a borrowing of the Old Norse variant ketill "cauldron".

== History ==
From Latin origin, the term cauldron is derived from caldrius, meaning “hot.” This word provided the root meaning for caldarium, a cooking-pot and the Anglo- Norman French cauderon, from which came the Middle English word caldron in the fourteenth century.

== Symbolism and mythology ==
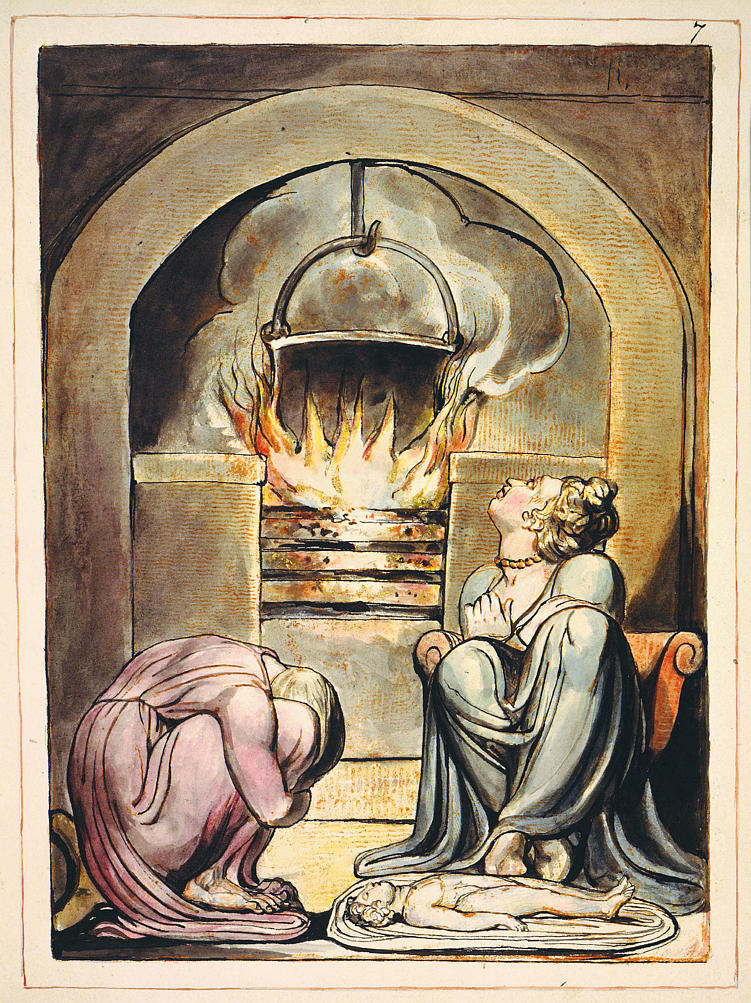
A cauldron over a fire in William Blake's illustrations to his mythical Europe a Prophecy first published in 1794. This version of the print is currently held by the Fitzwilliam Museum

Cauldrons have largely fallen out of use in the developed world as cooking vessels. While still used for practical purposes, a more common association in Western culture is the cauldron's use in witchcraft—a cliché popularized by various works of fiction. In English Renaissance theater plays—such as William Shakespeare's Macbeth, Thomas Middleton's The Witch, and Christopher Marlowe's The Jew of Malta—the cauldron symbolizes the danger of marginalized characters by linking the cauldron's use by these characters to death, femininity, and the subversion of a familiar domestic object into an instrument of murder. Also, in Irish folklore, a cauldron is purported to be where leprechauns keep their gold and treasure.

In some forms of Wicca, appropriating aspects of Celtic mythology, the cauldron is associated with the goddess Cerridwen. Welsh legend also tells of cauldrons that were useful to warring armies. In the second branch of the Mabinogi in the tale of Branwen, Daughter of Llŷr, the Pair Dadeni (Cauldron of Rebirth) is a magical cauldron in which dead warriors could be placed and then be returned to life, save that they lacked the power of speech. It was suspected that they lacked souls. These warriors could go back into battle until they were killed again. In Wicca and some other forms of neopagan or pagan belief systems, the cauldron is still used in magical practices. Most often a cauldron is made of cast iron and is used to burn loose incense on a charcoal disc, to make black salt (used in banishing rituals), for mixing herbs, or to burn petitions (paper with words of power or wishes written on them). Cauldrons symbolize not only the Goddess but also represent the womb (because it holds something) and on an altar, it represents earth because it is a working tool. Cauldrons are often sold in New Age or "metaphysical" stores and may have various symbols of power inscribed on them.

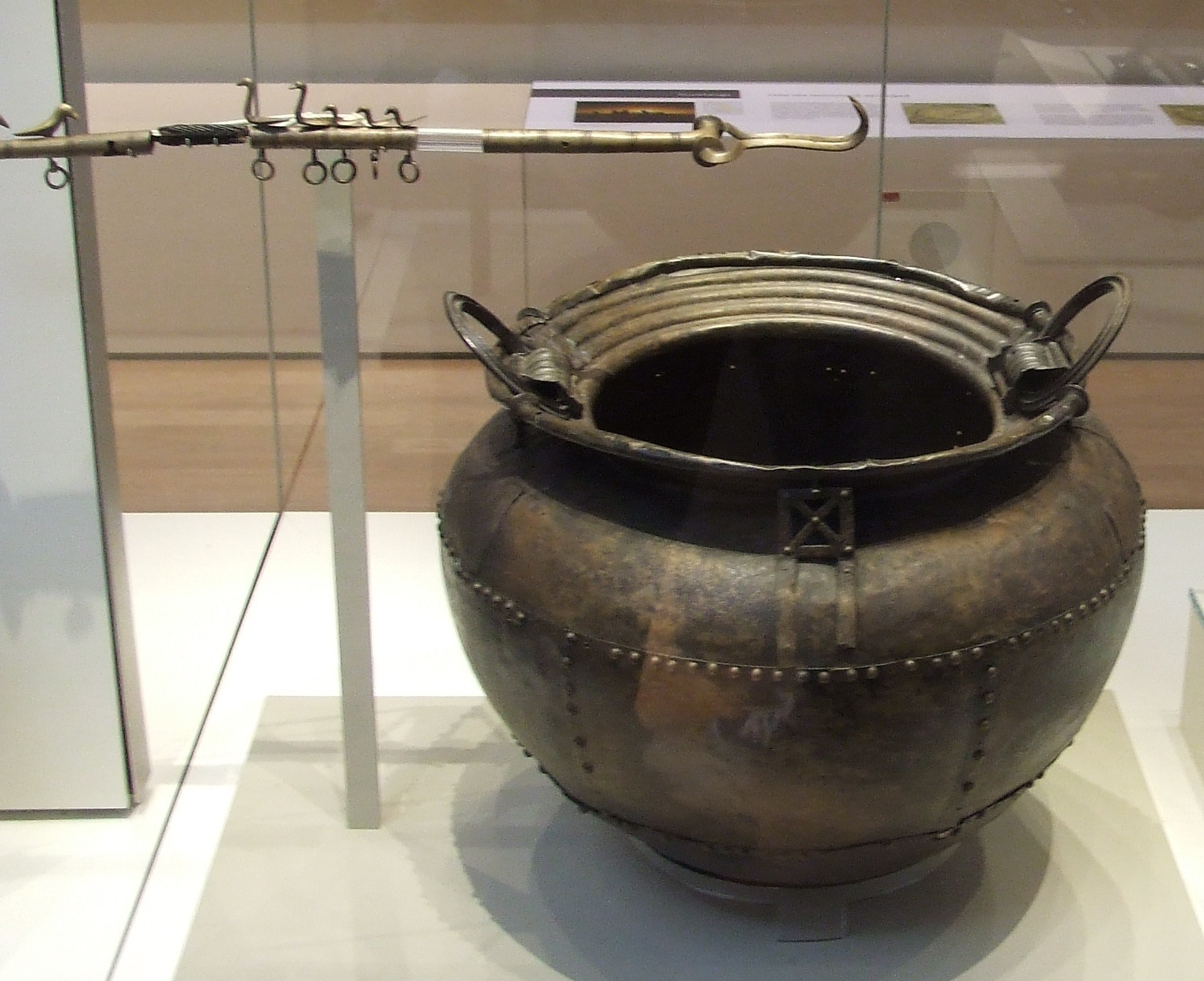
A Bronze Age cauldron, and flesh-hook, made from sheet bronze

The Holy Grail of Arthurian legend is sometimes referred to as a "cauldron", although traditionally the grail is thought of as a hand-held cup rather than the large pot that the word "cauldron" usually is used to mean. This may have resulted from the combination of the grail legend with earlier Celtic myths of magical cauldrons.

The common translation for ding is often referred to as a cauldron. In Chinese history and culture, possession of one or more ancient dings is often associated with power and dominion over the land. Therefore, the ding is often used as an implicit symbolism for power. The term "inquiring of the ding" (Chinese: 问鼎; pinyin: wèn dǐng) is often used to symbolize the use of divination or for the quest for power. One example of the ding cauldron and gaining power over the traditional provinces of China is the Nine Tripod Cauldrons (whether regarded as myth or history).

Archeologically intact actual cauldrons with apparent cultural symbolism include:

- the Gundestrup cauldron, made in the 2nd or 1st century BC, found at Gundestrup, Denmark
- a Bronze Age cauldron found at Hassle, Sweden
- Ceremonial cauldrons from the ancient Armenian state of Urartu
- the cauldron where the Olympic Flame burns for the duration of the Olympic Games

Cauldrons known only through myth and literature include:

- Dagda's Cauldron
- The Cauldron of Dyrnwch the Giant
- Pair Dadeni
- Cauldron of Hymir

== Gallery ==
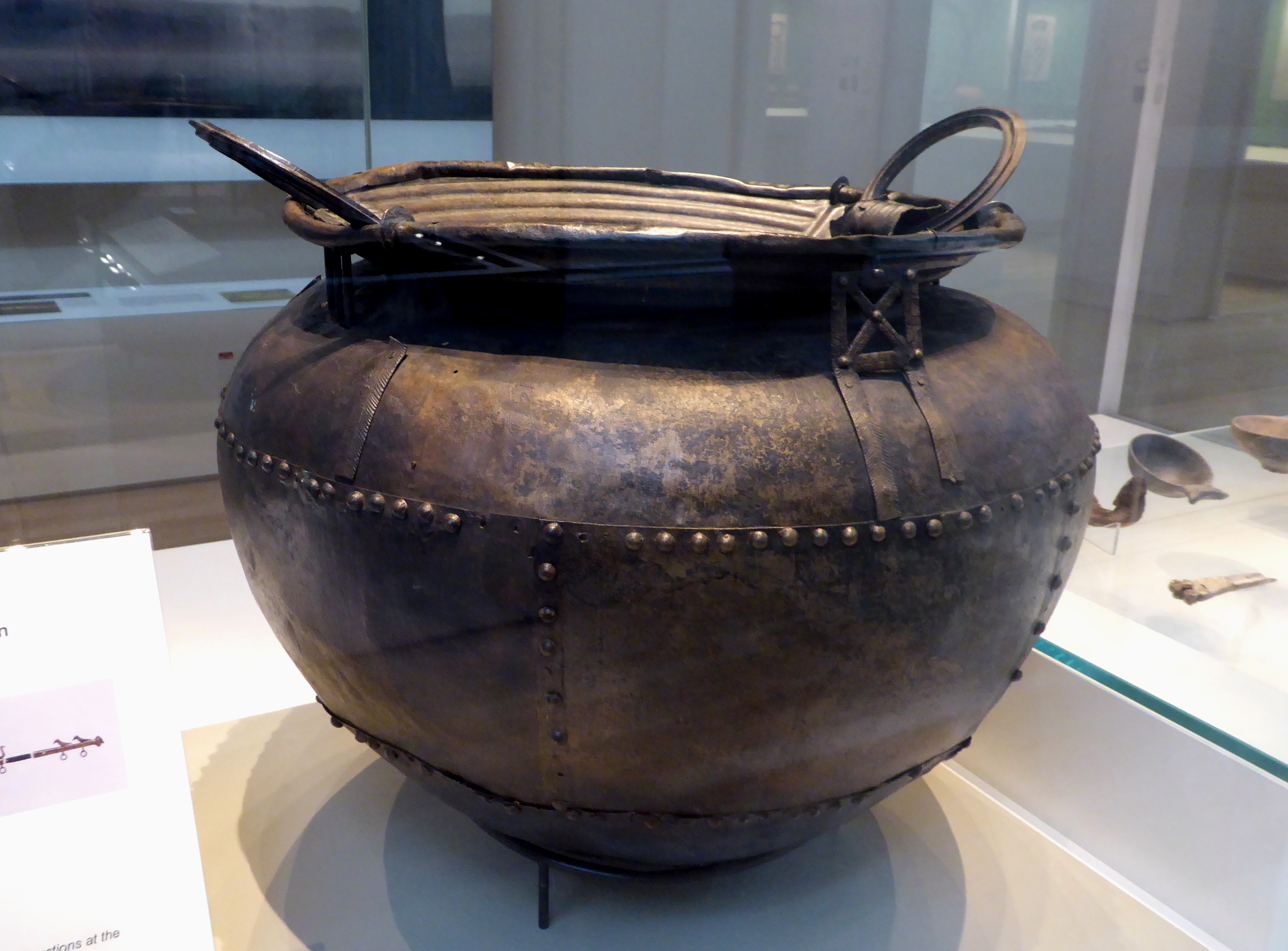
Battersea Cauldron, c. 800 BC, riveted late Bronze age cauldron, found London England.

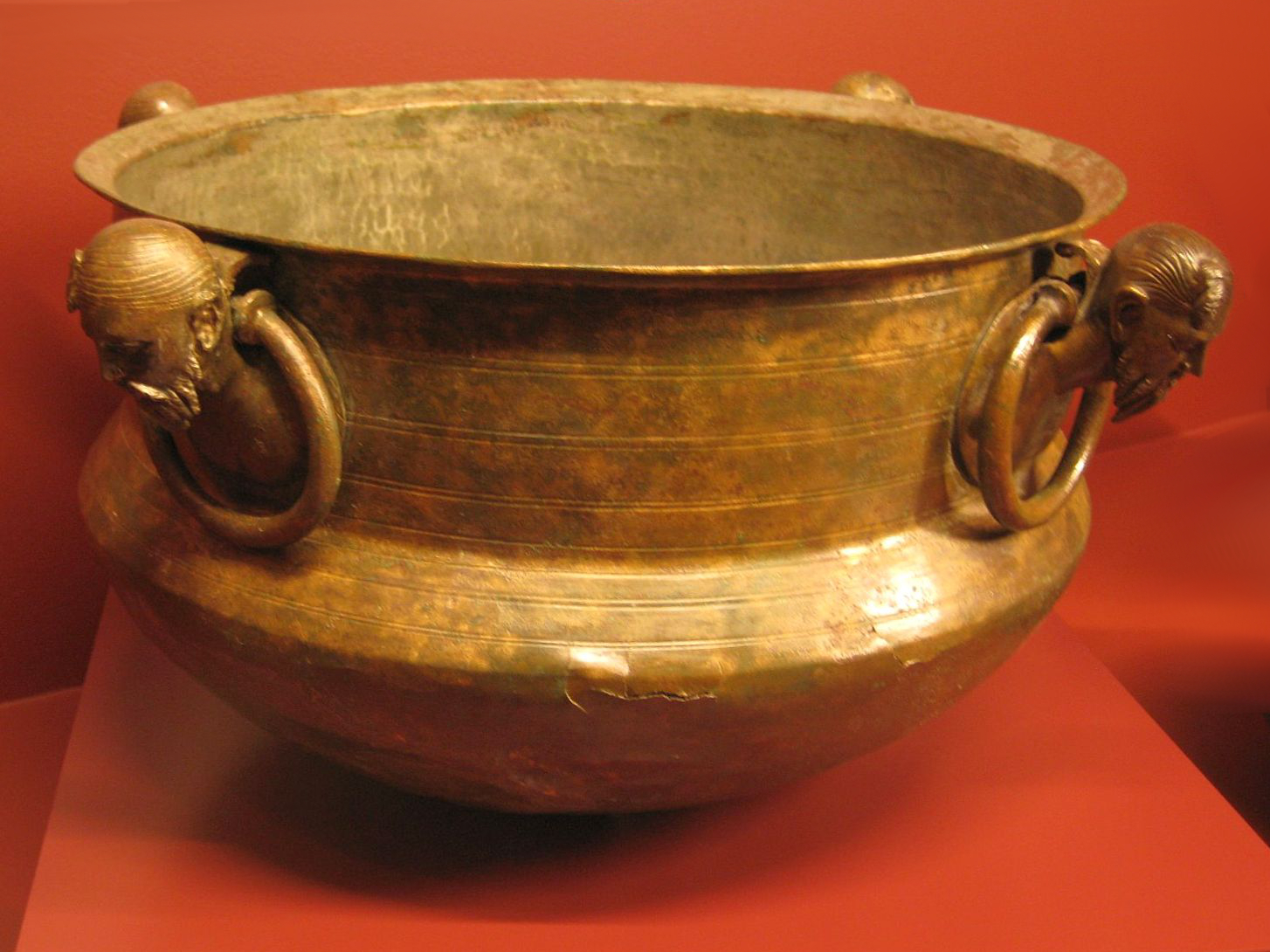
Mušov cauldron. A Roman bronze cauldron found in 1988 in a Germanic chieftains grave in Mušov, Czech Republic dating to 2nd century AD.

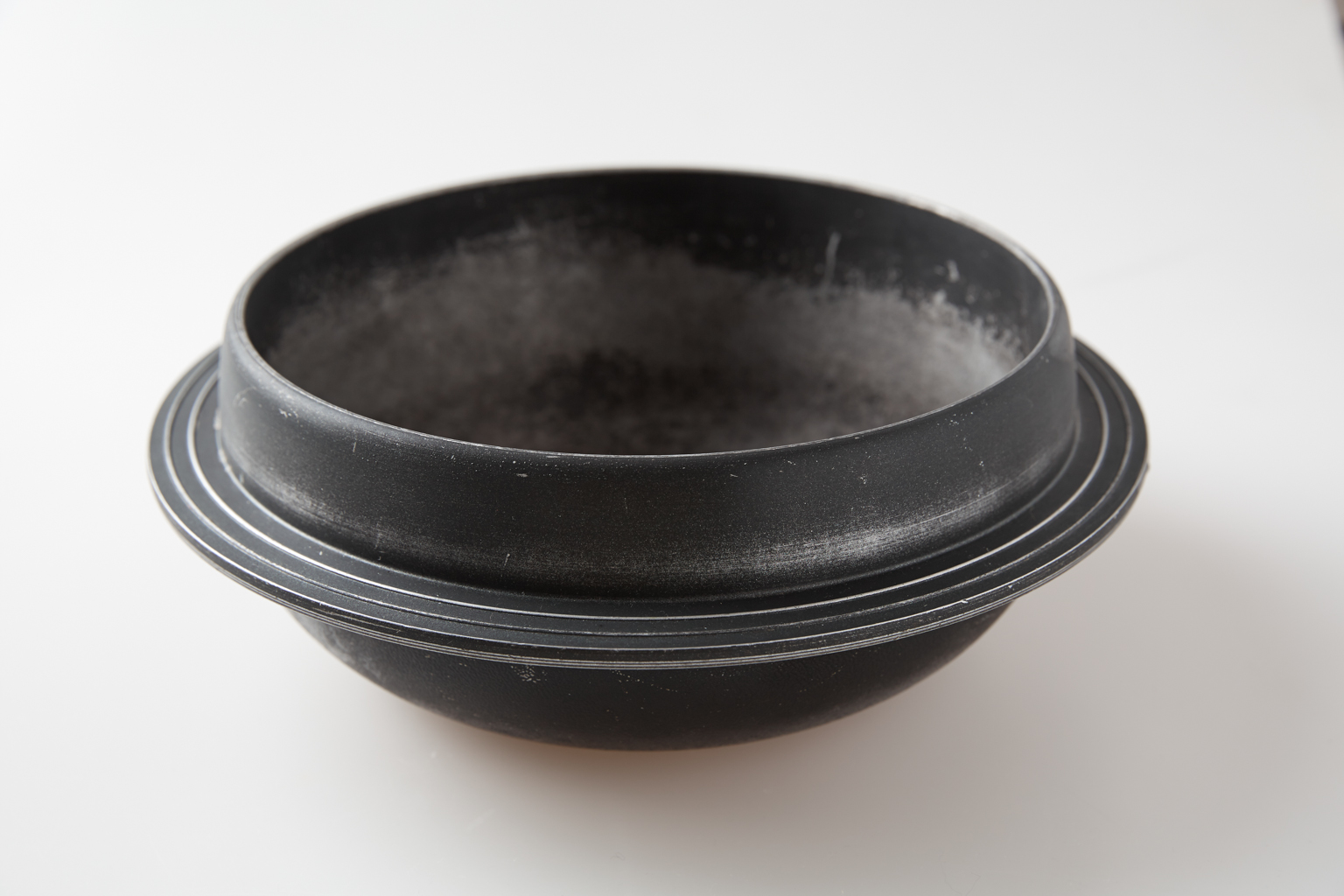
Sot, a Korean cauldron used to cook rice

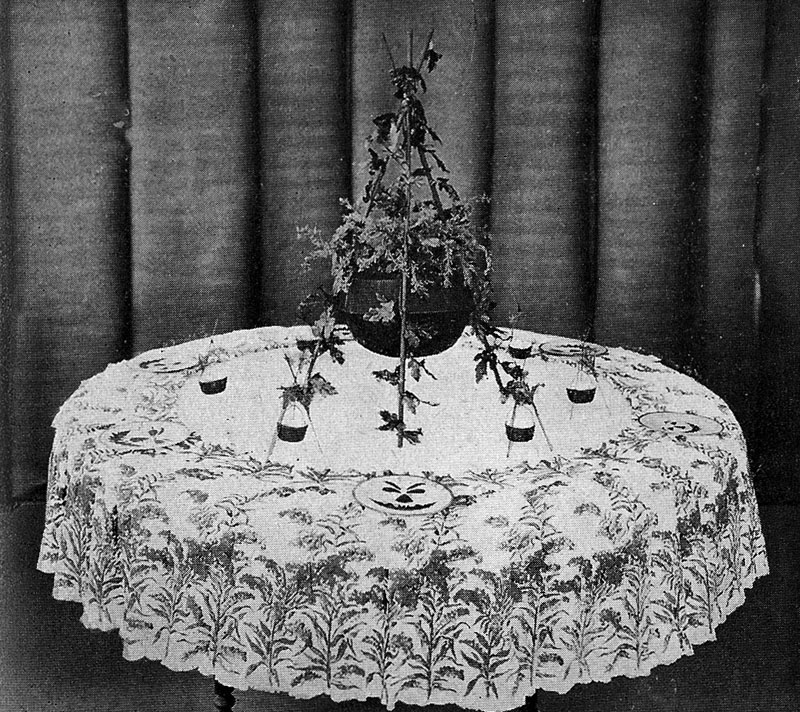
A Witches'-caldron table

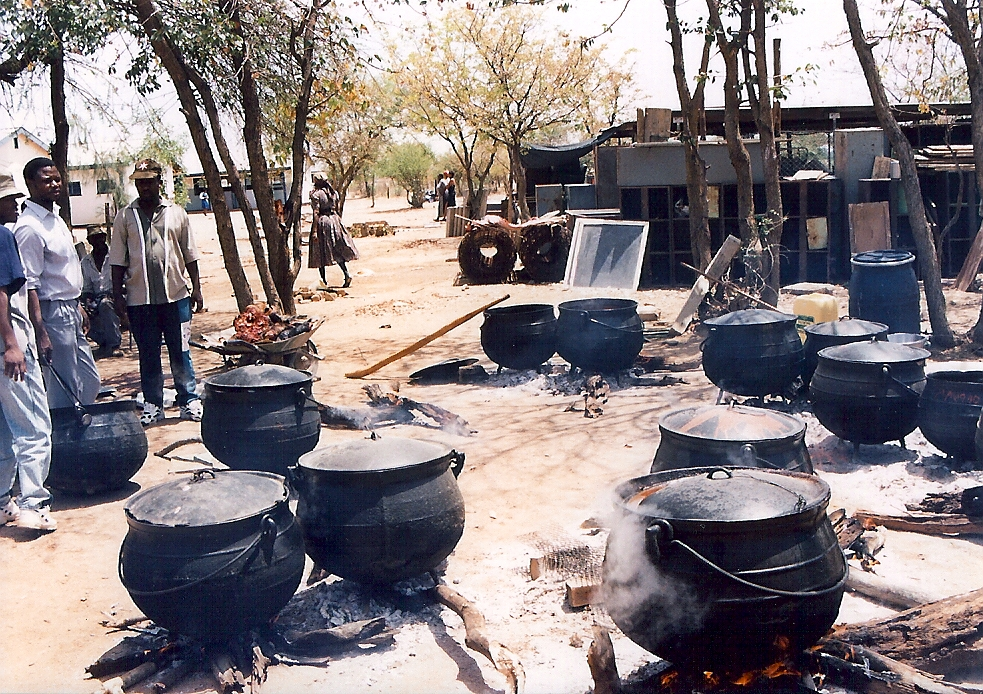
Three-legged iron pots being used to cater for a school-leavers' party in Botswana. Everyday cooking is done in the school kitchens.

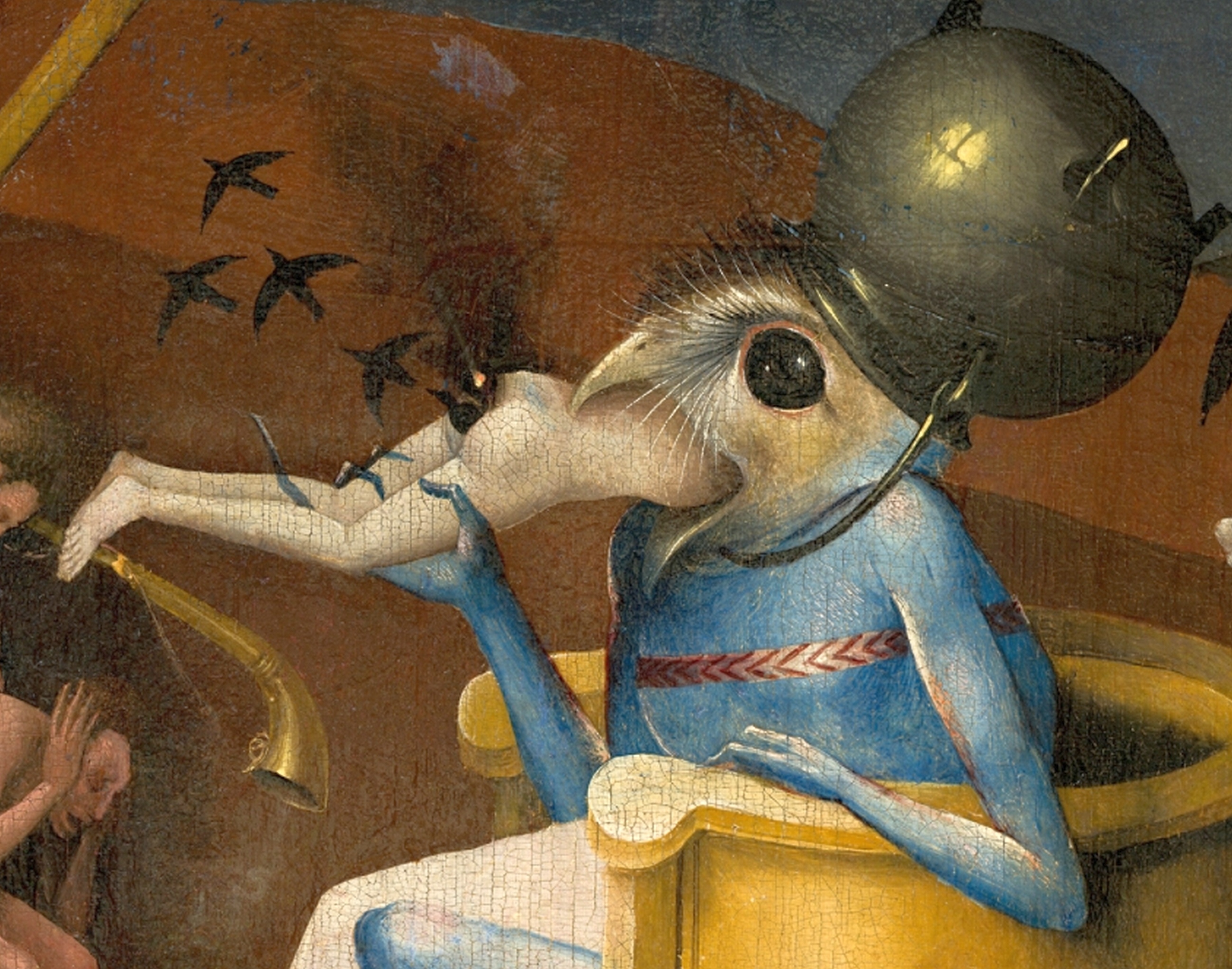
The Garden of Earthly Delights, bird-headed monster or the "Prince of Hell" (close-up head), a name derived from the cauldron he wears on his head.

A cauldron pictured in the coat of arms of Padasjoki

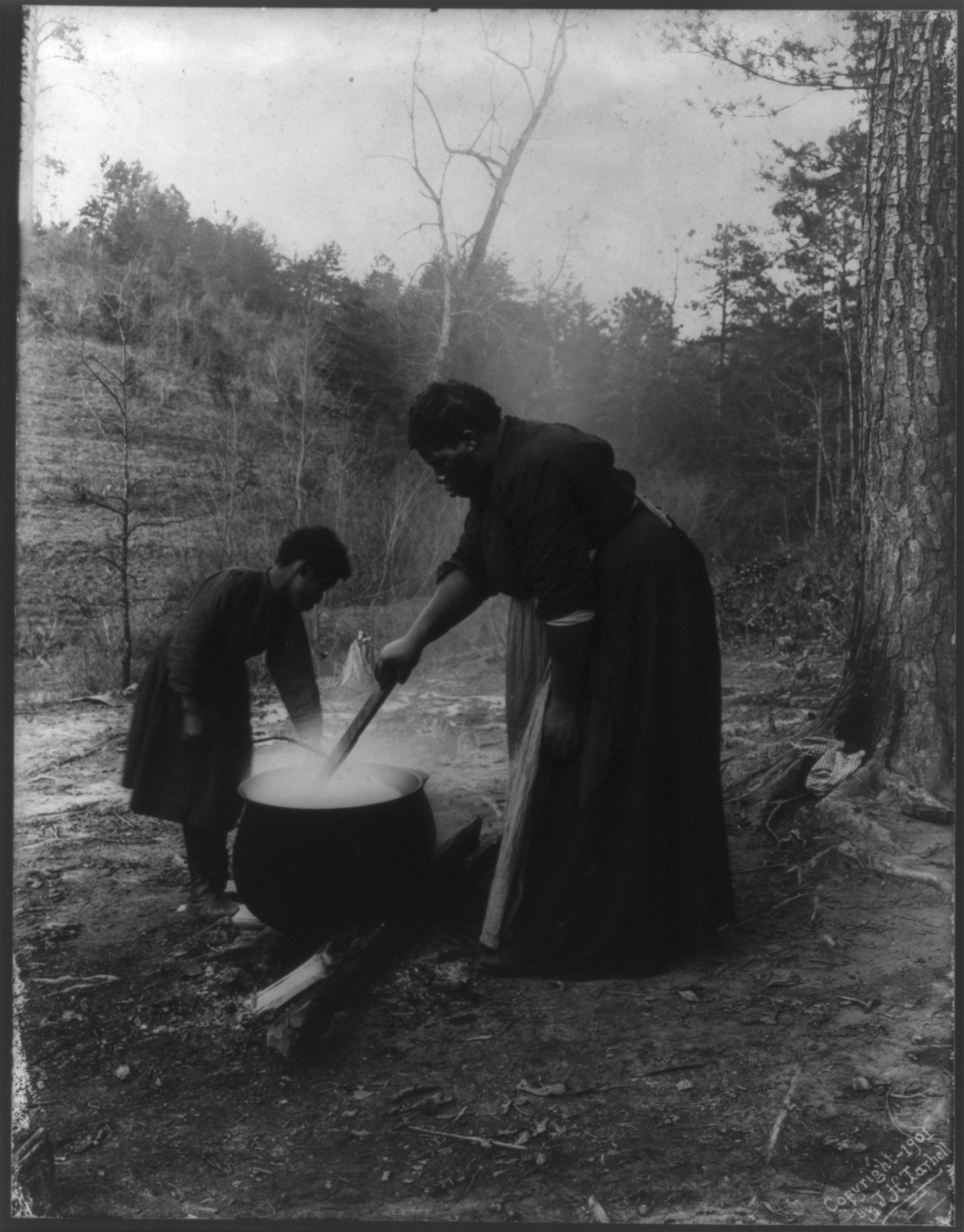
African American woman and child outdoors, standing by boiling cauldron of water, c. 1901.

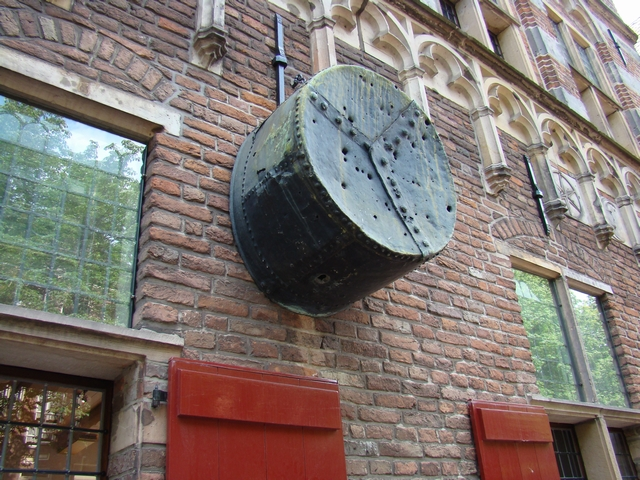
Execution cauldron at Deventer (Netherlands)

== See also ==
- Alfet – an ancient cauldron used to perform trial by ordeal
- Chaldron – an English measure of dry volume and an obsolete spelling of 'cauldron'
- Eldhrímnir – a cauldron that appears in Norse mythology
- Fire pot – for heating and supporting a cooking vessel
- Gulyásleves – Hungarian soup traditionally prepared in a portable cauldron (bogrács)
- Kama – Japanese cast-iron heating pot
- List of cooking vessels
- Potjiekos – South African dish traditionally prepared in a three-legged cauldron (potjie)
- Sacrificial tripod – a simple support for a cauldron used in religious rituals
