= Alfet =

Medieval torture device

An alfet (Old English: ālfæt, "fire vat") was an ancient cauldron filled with boiling water, into which an accused person was to plunge his arm up to his elbow. Its use was a form of trial by ordeal. The arm and hand were then bound and left for three days. If the wound was found to have begun to heal cleanly the person was judged to be innocent. However, if the scald was infected or unhealed, the victim was held to be guilty. It was also used for purgation.

The earliest known use of the noun Alfet is in the Old English period (pre-1150).
