= Hassle =

Coordinates: 59°21′N 15°22′E

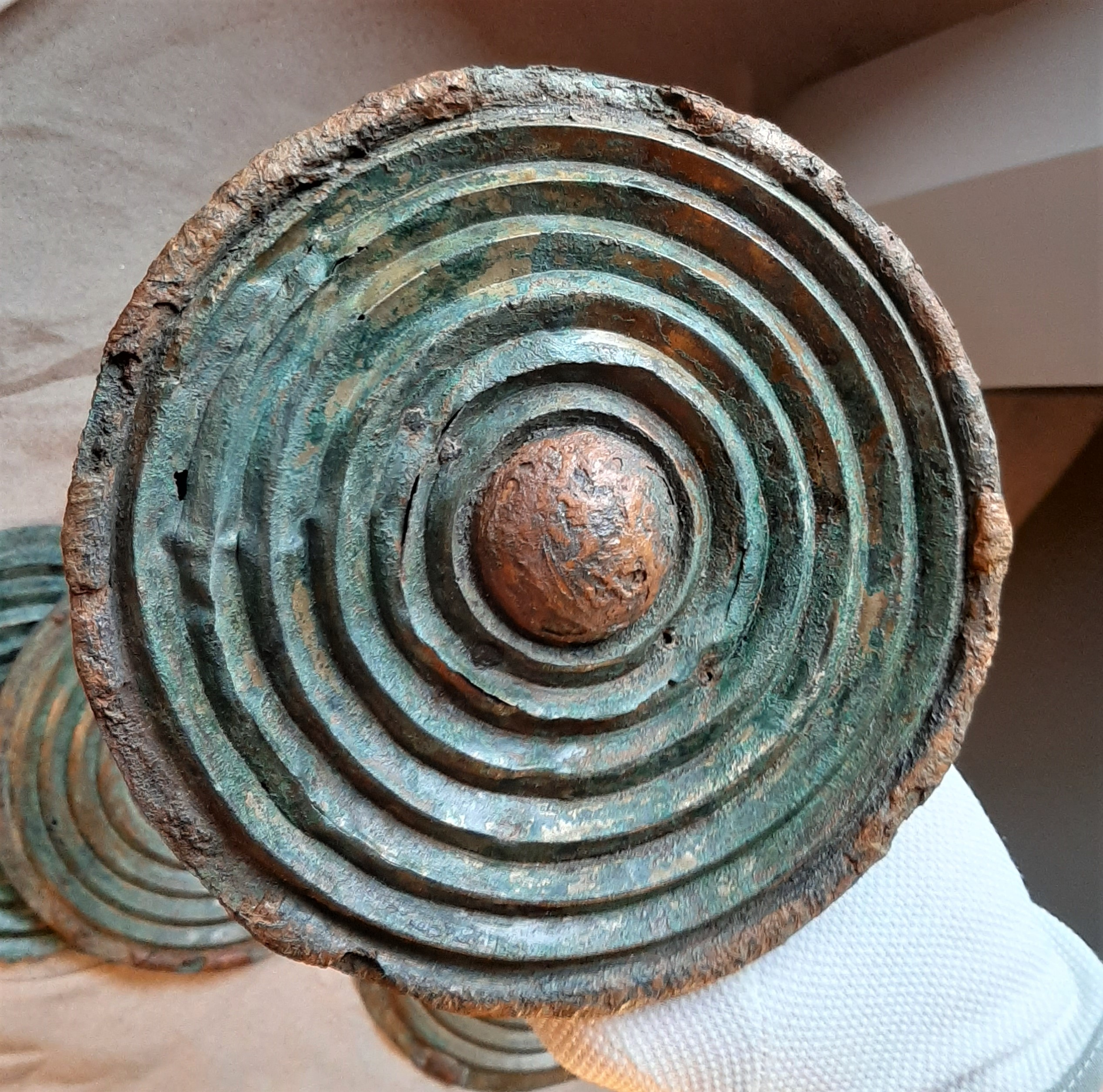
Bronze plate

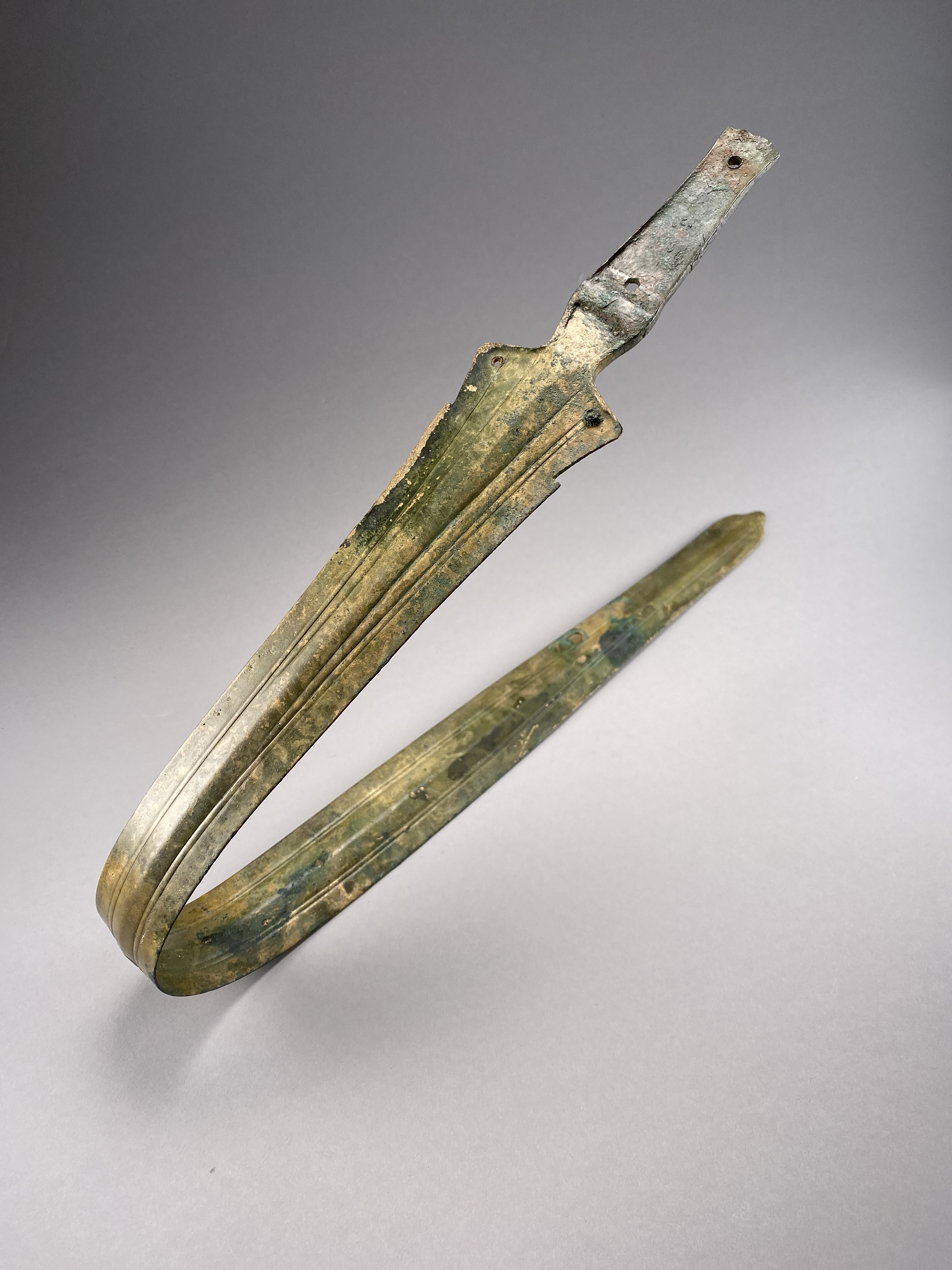
Sword

Hassle is a location at Örebro Municipality in Örebro County, Sweden. It was the site of the discovery of the Hassle treasure.

== Hassle treasure ==
The Hassle treasure (Hassleskatten) was found at Hassle in the parish of Glanshammar during 1936. The artifacts consist of a large bronze cauldron which contained two Bronze Age swords of the Hallstatt type, a pommel of bronze, two bronze buckets with ciste a cordoni, two small hooks of bronze and twelve large circular bronze plates with fittings of iron. All of the items were imported. The cauldron belongs to a special kind of cultic cauldron usually found in Italy and Greece, while the buckets are of a kind found in southern and central Europe. The artifacts are now at the Swedish History Museum in Stockholm with copies on display in the Örebro County Museum. The burial ground at Hassle has the RAÄ number Glanshammar 54: 1.
