= Gulyásleves =

Hungarian soup

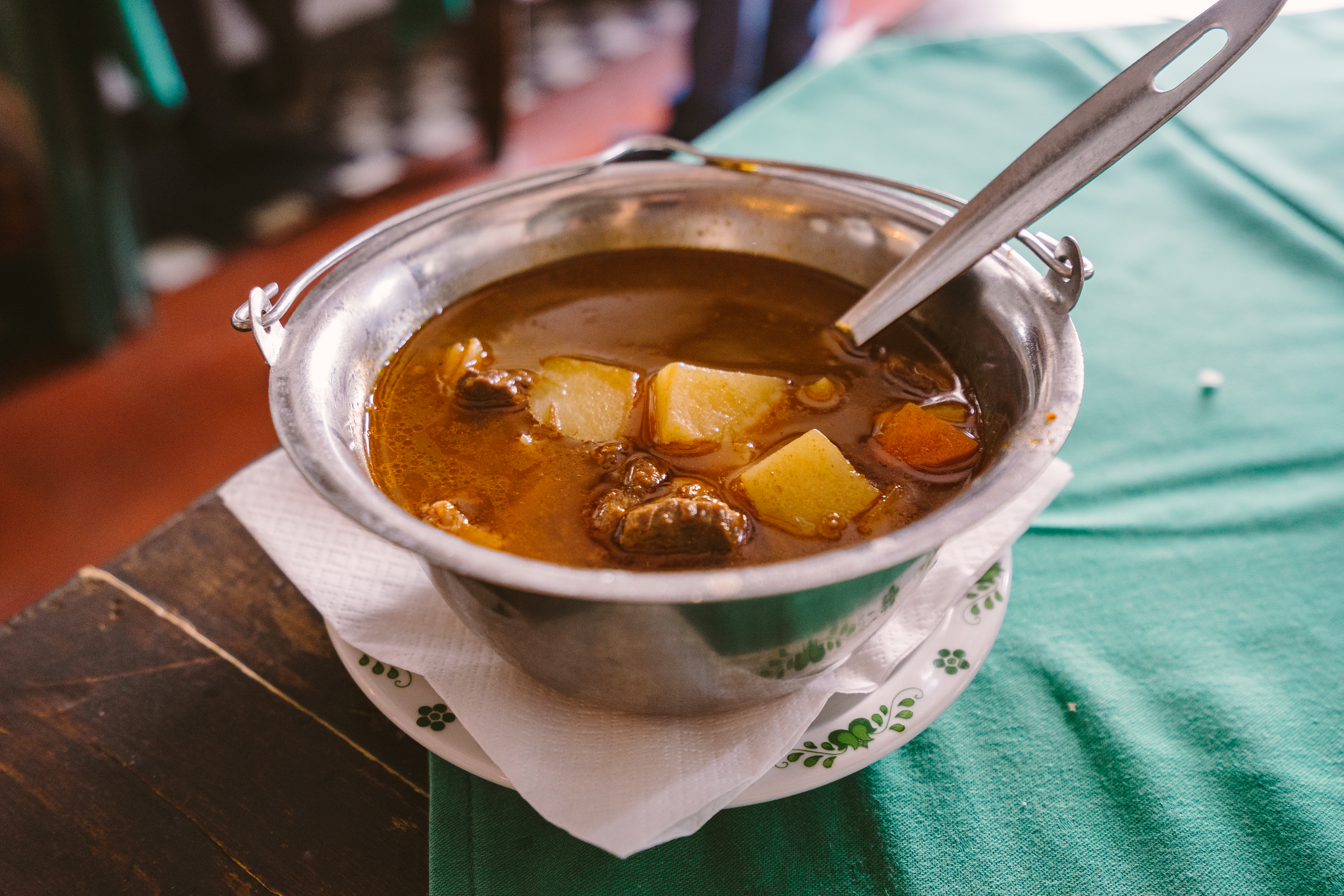
- Type: Soup
- Place of origin: Hungary
- Main ingredients: Beef, vegetables, paprika and other spices

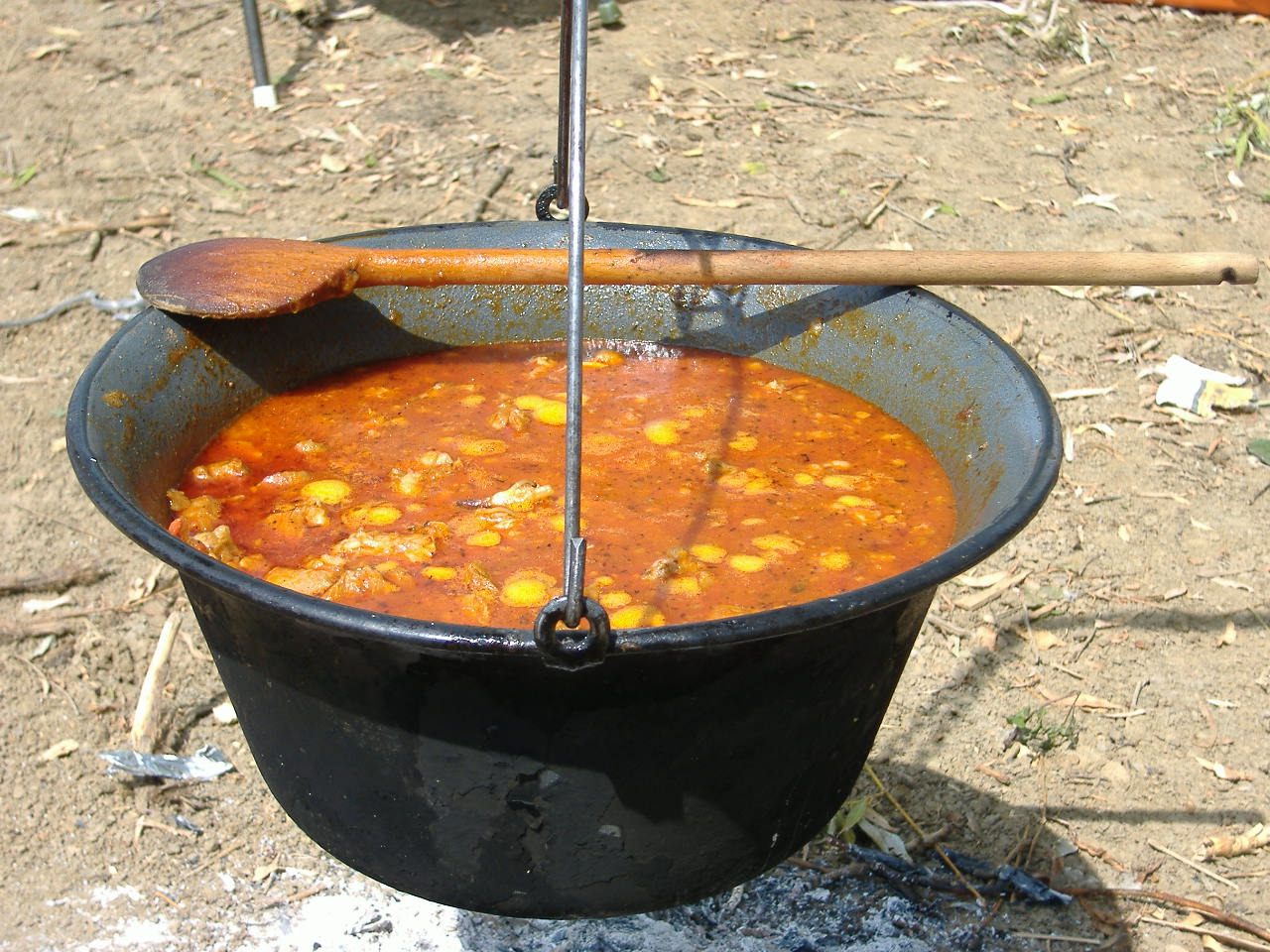
An outdoor cauldron in Hungary, used for cooking gulyás

Gulyásleves (gulyás 'herdsman' and leves 'soup' in Hungarian), is a Hungarian soup, made of beef, vegetables, ground paprika and other spices. It originates from a dish cooked by the cattlemen (Hungarian: gulya 'cattle herd', gulyás 'cattle herder'), who tended their herds in the Great Hungarian Plain (known as the Alföld or puszta in Hungarian). These Hungarian cowboys often camped out with their cattle days away from populated areas, so they had to make their food from ingredients they could carry with themselves, and this food had to be cooked in the one available portable cauldron (called bogrács) over an open fire.

The word bogrács is a loanword from Ottoman Turkish باقراج (spelled bakraç in modern Turkish), meaning a cauldron made of copper; from the word "copper" in Old Turkish language (spelled bakır in modern Turkish).

The original dish called bográcsgulyás was a stew, not a soup. Traditional Hungarian bográcsgulyás 'cauldron goulash' is often still cooked outdoors over an open fire in a cauldron, giving the appearance of a barbecue. Later on when the dish left the peasant cuisines and became popular even in the town, it started to be cooked more like a soup. Nowadays the dish served in the majority of Hungarian restaurants is a soup, but the locals cook the dish called gulyás as a stew and gulyásleves like a soup. They should differ only in the amount of water used in preparation. The official vocational cookbook for Hungarian restaurant trainees still contains recipes for both and lists the core ingredients as finely diced onions, peppers, tomatoes, meat, garlic, salt, caraway seeds, potatoes and homemade noodles called csipetké.

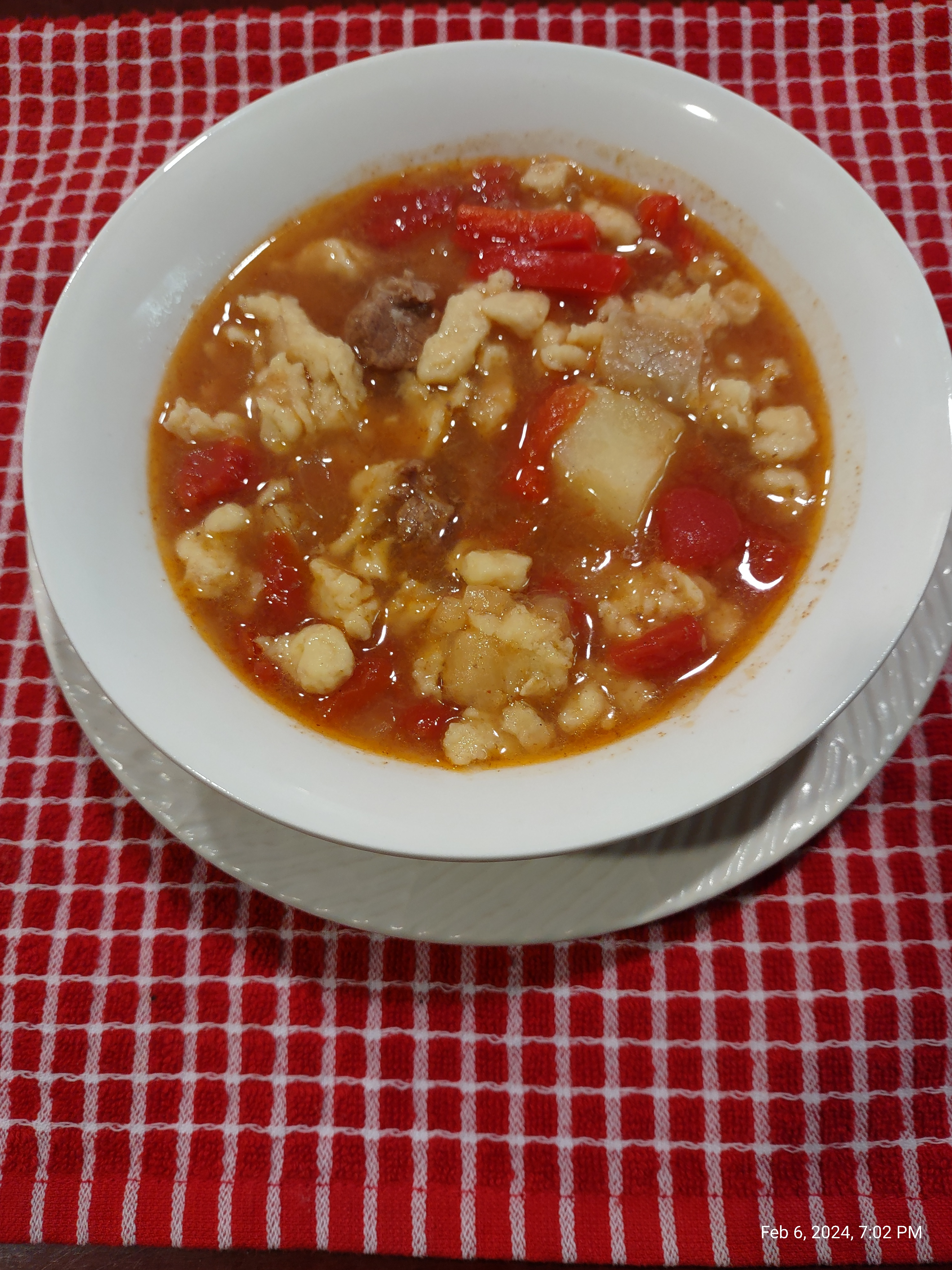
Gulyásleves

There are different variations of the recipe. The meat is beef, but often mixed meats are used (e.g. beef, pork and mutton or lamb). Tomatoes, carrots and fresh peppers (often hot chilies) are also added. Onions, paprika and caraway seeds provide its flavour. Cubed potatoes or pasta squares are typically added to this spicy soup. This dish is not to be confused with other dishes, like pörkölt or paprikás.

== See also ==
- Goulash
- Beef stew
- American goulash
