= Bronze Age sword =

Historical style of weapon

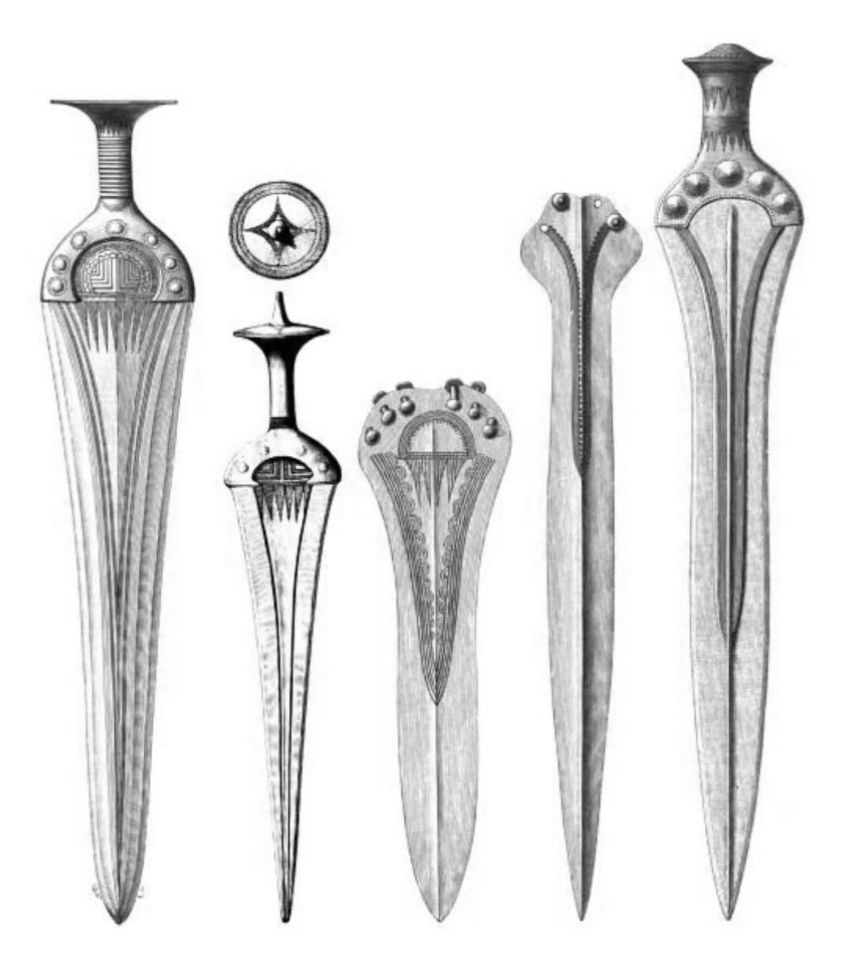
Bronze Age swords from Central Europe, c. 17th century BC

Bronze Age swords were a type of weapon prominent during the Bronze Age. They were replaced by iron swords during the early part of the 1st millennium BC. Typical Bronze Age swords were between 60 and 80 cm long, significantly shorter weapons are categorized as short swords or daggers. From an early time swords with lengths in excess of 100 cm were also produced. Some Bronze Age swords have also been referred to as antenna swords due to their design.

== Predecessors ==
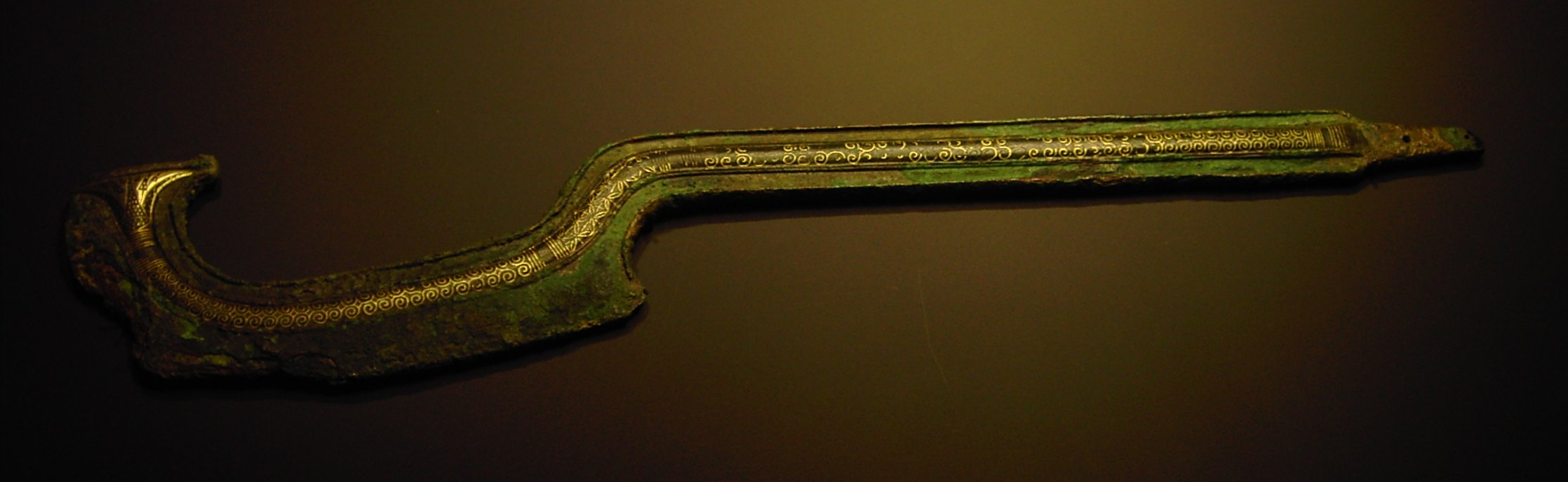
18th-century BC khopesh, Shechem (Tell Balatah), West Bank, Palestine; blade decorations with electrum inlays

Before bronze, stone (such as flint and obsidian) was used as the primary material for edged cutting tools and weapons. Stone, however, is too brittle for long, thin implements such as swords. With the introduction of copper, and subsequently bronze, knives could be made longer, leading to the sword.

Thus, the development of the sword from the dagger was gradual, and in 2004 the first "swords" were claimed for the Early Bronze Age (c. 33rd to 31st centuries), based on finds at Arslantepe by Marcella Frangipane, professor of prehistory and protohistory of the Near and Middle East at Sapienza University of Rome. A cache of nine swords and daggers was found; they are made of an arsenic-copper alloy. Among them, three swords were inlaid with silver.

These are weapons of a total length of 45–60 cm (18–24 in), which could be described as either short swords or long daggers. Some other similar swords have been found in Turkey, and are described by Thomas Zimmermann. An exceptionally well-preserved example, similar in construction to the Arslantepe swords, was discovered in 2017 in the Venetian Monastery of Lazarus.

The sword remained extremely rare for another millennium, and became more widespread only with the closing of the 3rd millennium. The "swords" of this later period can still readily be interpreted as daggers, as with the copper specimen from Naxos (dated roughly 2800 to 2300 BC), with a length of just below 36 cm (14 in), but individual specimens of the Cycladic "copper swords" of the period around 2300 reach a length up to 60 cm. The first weapons that can unambiguously be classified as swords are those found in Minoan Crete, dated to about 1700 BC, which reached lengths of more than 100 cm (39 in). These are the "type A" swords of the Aegean Bronze Age.

== Aegean ==
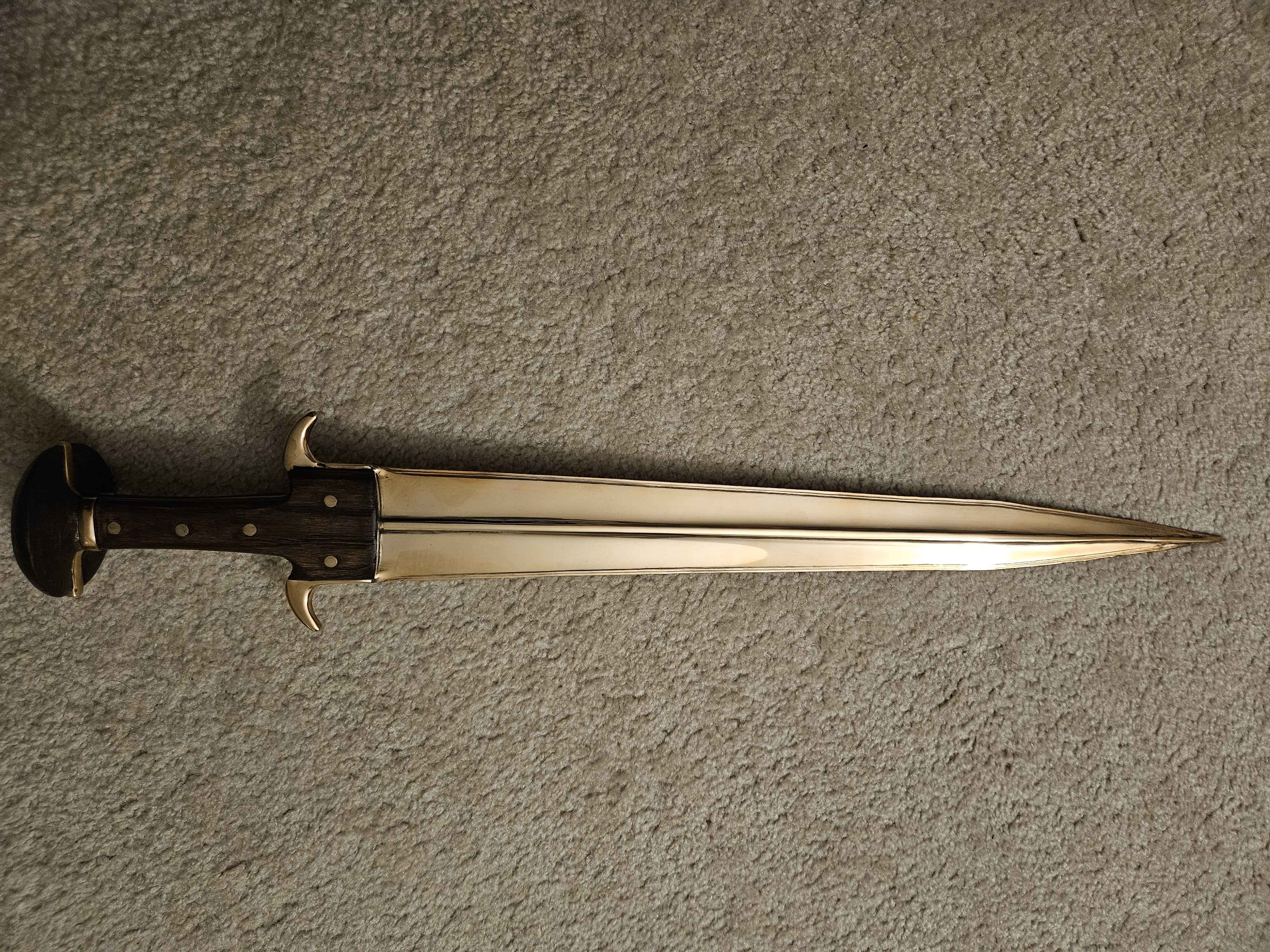
Replica of a Mycenaean Type G bronze sword, widely used in the Late Bronze Age Aegean

The Minoan and Mycenaean (Middle to Late Aegean Bronze Age) swords are classified in types labeled A to H following Sandars (1961, 1963), the "Sandars typology". Types A and B ("tab-tang") are the earliest from about the 17th to 16th centuries, types C ("horned" swords) and D ("cross" swords) from the 15th century, types E and F ("T-hilt" swords) from the 13th and 12th. The 13th to 12th centuries also see a revival of the "horned" type, classified as types G and H. Type H swords are associated with the Sea Peoples and were found in Anatolia (Pergamon) and Greece. Contemporary with types E to H is the so-called "Naue II" type, imported from Southeastern Europe.

== Europe ==
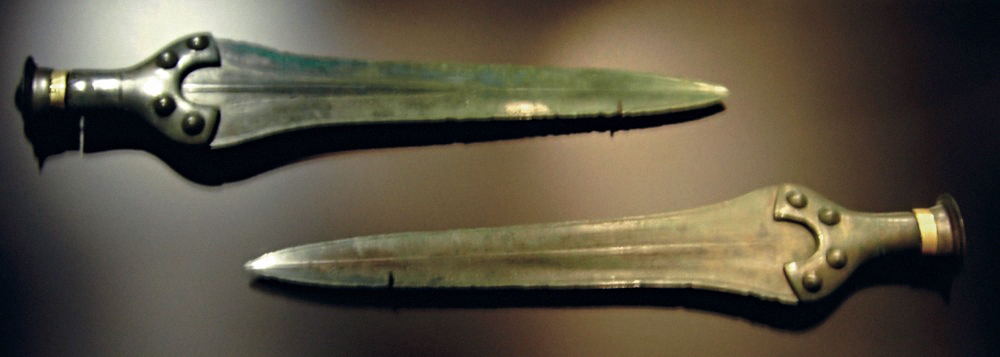
Swords found together with the Nebra sky disk, c. 1600 BC. Typologically, these swords are of the "Sögel" type, but their shape and decoration shows influence of the "Hajdúsámson-Apa" type found in Hungary.

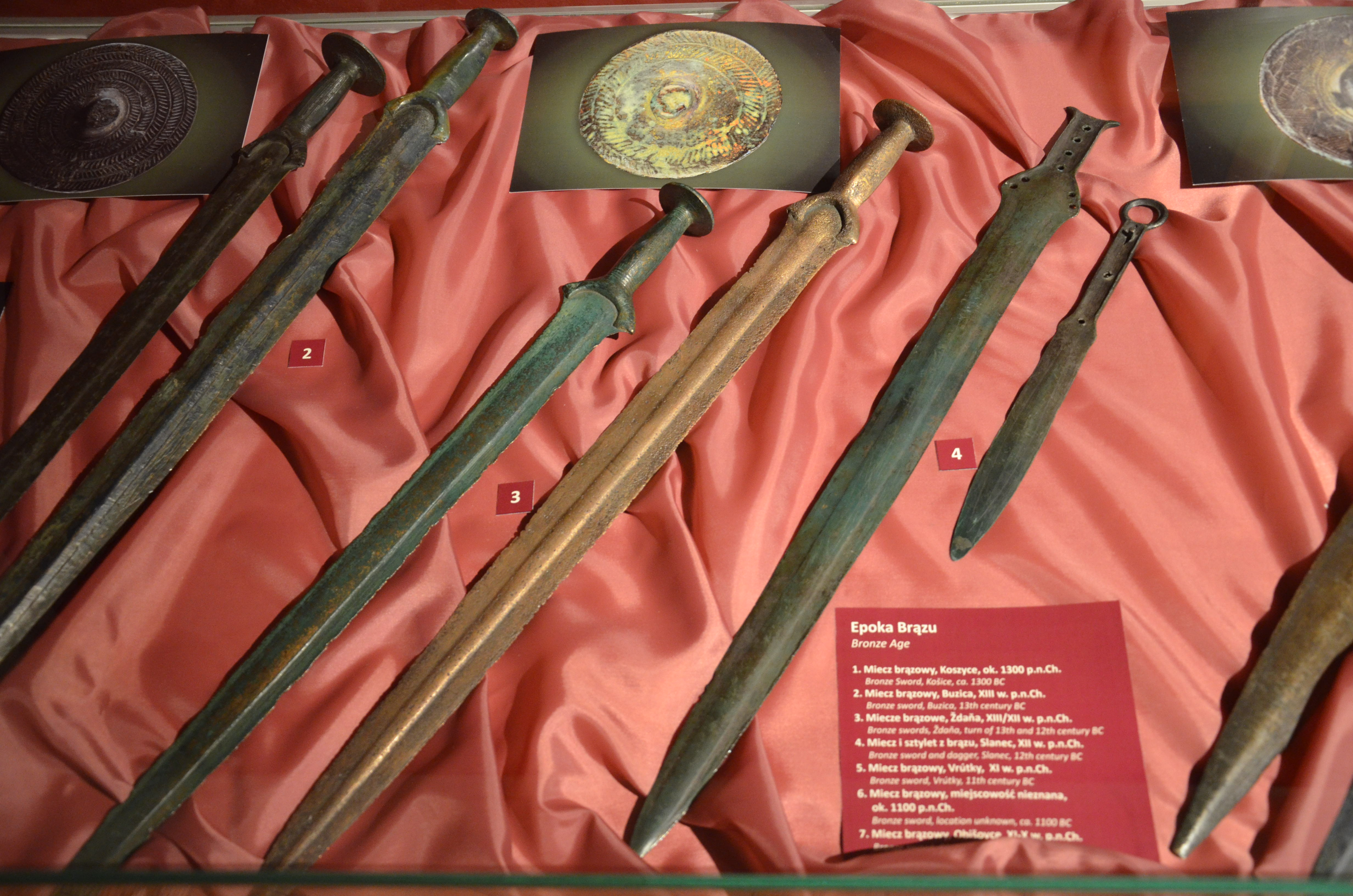
Typical "Naue II" type "Griffzungenschwert" indicated by No. 4

One of the most important, and longest-lasting, types of prehistoric European swords was the "Naue II" type, named for Julius Naue who first described them and also known as "Griffzungenschwert" or "grip-tongue sword". It first appears in c. the 13th century BC in Northern Italy (or a general Urnfield background), and survived well into the Iron Age, with a life-span of about seven centuries, until the 6th century BC. During its lifetime the basic design was maintained, although the material changed from bronze to iron. Naue II swords were exported from Europe to the Aegean, and as far afield as Ugarit, beginning about 1200 BC, i.e. just a few decades before the final collapse of the palace cultures in the Bronze Age collapse. Naue II swords could be as long as 85 cm (33 in), but most specimens fall into the 60–70 cm (24–28 in) in length.

Swords from the Nordic Bronze Age appear from c. the 17th century BC, often showing characteristic spiral patterns. The early Nordic swords are also comparatively short; a specimen discovered in 1912 near Bragby, Uppland, Sweden, dated to about 1800 to 1500 BC, was just over 60 cm (24 in) long. This sword was, however, classified as of the Hajdúsámson-Apa type, and was presumably imported. The Vreta Kloster sword discovered in 1897 (dated 1600 to 1500 BC) has a blade length (the hilt is missing) of 46 cm (18 in).

A typical variant for European swords is the "leaf shaped" blade, which was most common in North-west Europe at the end of the Bronze Age, on the British Isles in particular. The "carp's tongue sword" is a type of bronze sword that was common to Western Europe during ca. the 9th to 8th centuries BC. The blade of the carp's tongue sword was wide and parallel for most of its length but the final third narrowed into a thin tip intended for thrusting. The design was probably developed in north-western France, and combined the broad blade useful for slashing with a thinner, elongated tip suitable for thrusting. Its advantages saw its adoption across Atlantic Europe. In Britain, the metalwork in the south east derived its name from this sword: the Carp's Tongue complex. Notable examples of this type were part of the Isleham Hoard.

The Bronze Age-style sword and construction methods died out at the end of the early Iron Age (Hallstatt D), around 600-500 BC, when swords were once again replaced by daggers in most of Europe. An exception is the xiphos from Greece, the development of which continued for several more centuries.

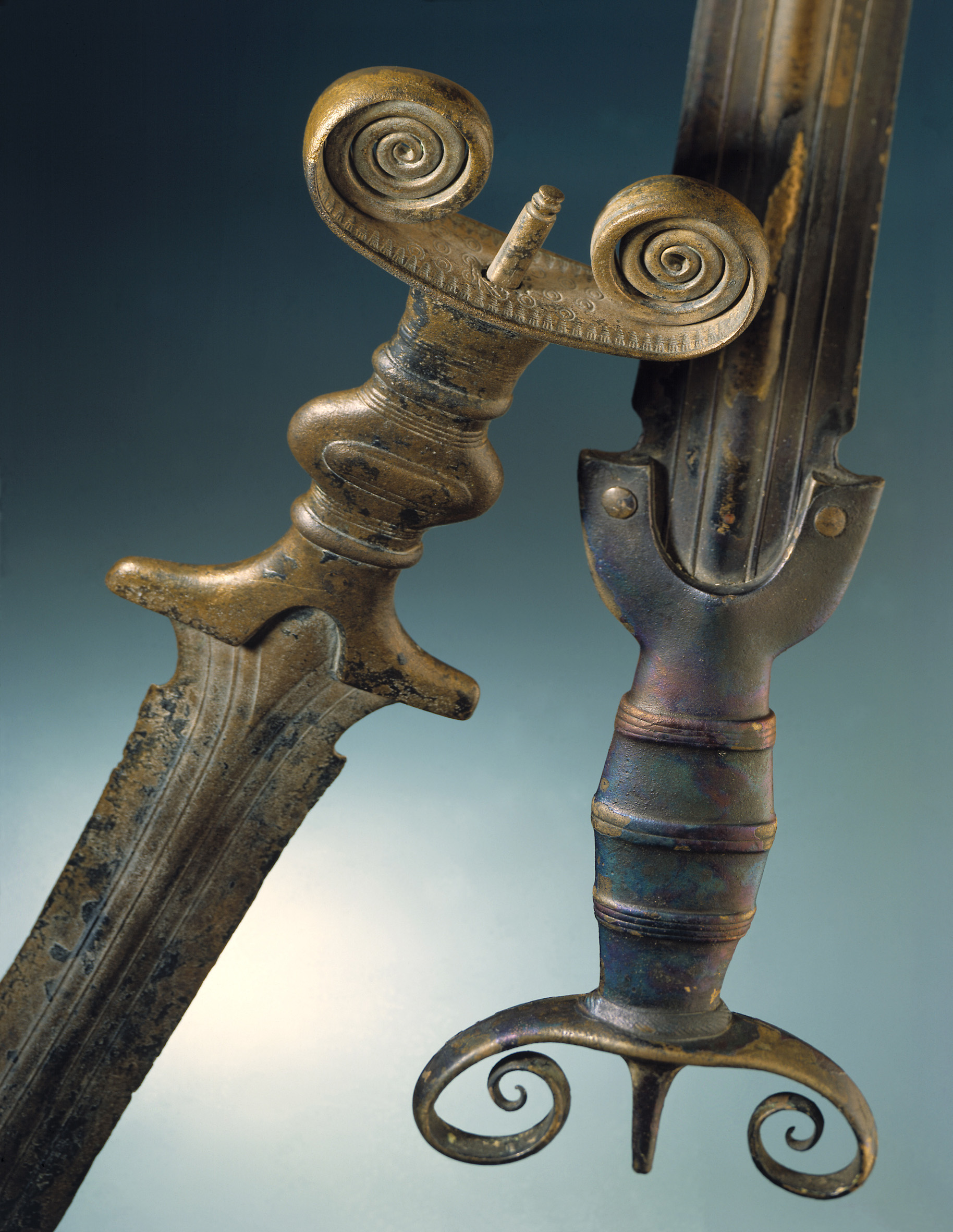
Antenna swords of the Hallstatt B period (c. 10th century BC), found near Lake Neuchâtel (in Auvernier and Cortaillod; Laténium inv. nr. AUV-40315 and CORT-216, respectively)

The "antenna sword", named for the pair of ornaments suggesting antennae on its hilt, is a type of the Late Bronze Age, continued in early iron swords of the East Hallstatt and Italy region.

== China ==
Sword production in China is attested from the Bronze Age Shang dynasty, from roughly 1200 BC. The technology for bronze swords reached its high point during the Warring States period and Qin dynasty (221 BC – 207 BC). Amongst the Warring States period swords, some unique technologies were used, such as casting high-tin edges over softer, lower-tin cores, or the application of diamond shaped patterns on the blade (see the Sword of Gou Jian). Also unique for Chinese bronzes is the consistent use of high-tin bronze (17-21% tin), which is very hard and breaks under excess stress, whereas other cultures preferred lower tin bronze (usually 10%), which bends instead. China continued to make both iron and bronze swords longer than any other region; iron completely replaced bronze only in the early Han dynasty.

== India ==
Bronze Age swords have been found from the Vedic Period. In Sinauli, antenna swords were found buried alongside chariots.

Swords are also found in archaeological findings of the Ochre Coloured Pottery culture throughout the Ganga-Yamuna Doab region of India, commonly made of copper and tin, but in some instances made of bronze. Diverse specimens have been discovered in Fatehgarh, where there are several varieties of hilt. These swords have been variously dated to periods between 1700 and 1400 BCE, but were probably used more extensively during 1200-600 BCE (Painted Grey Ware culture, Iron Age India).

== Japan ==
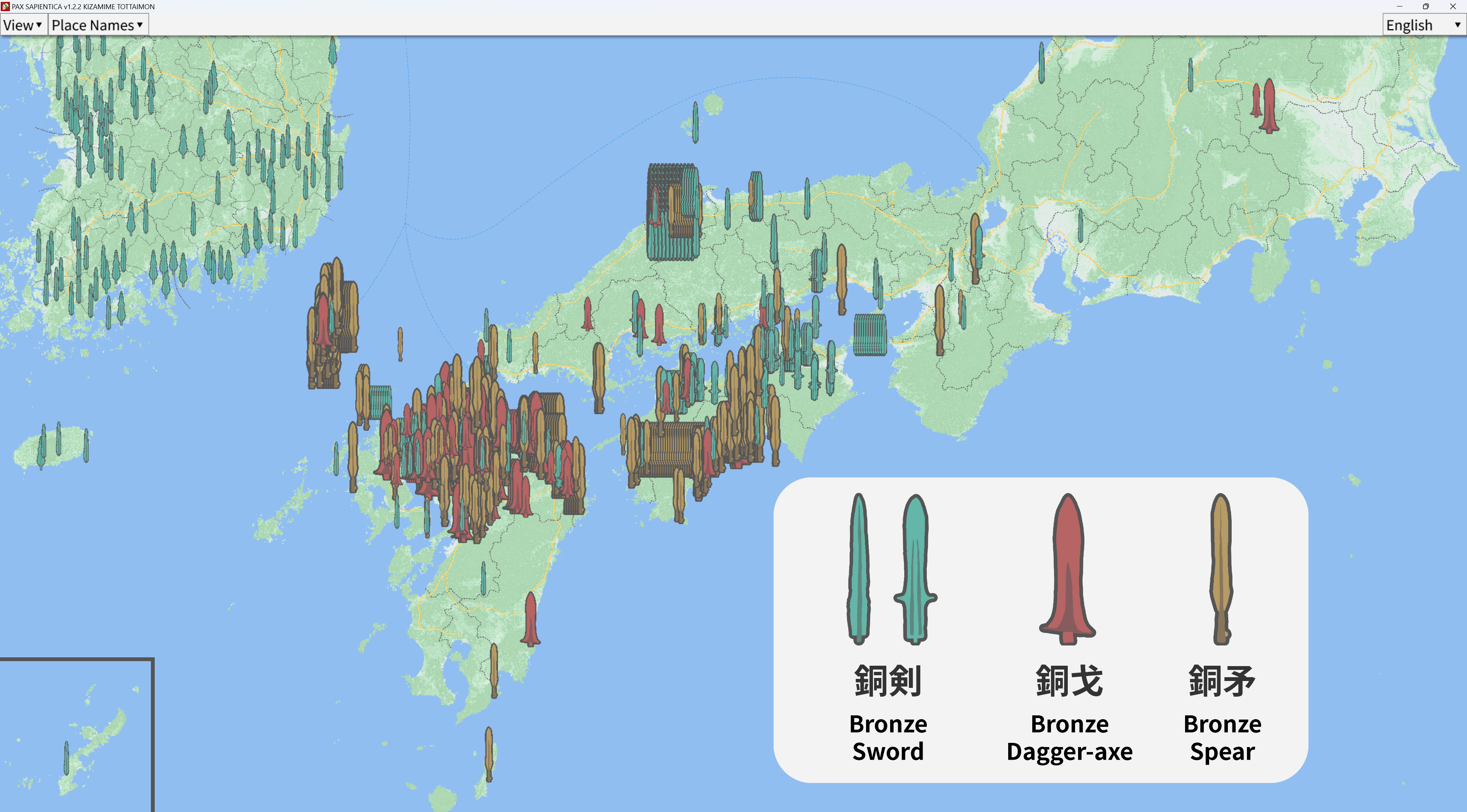
Distribution of Weapon Shaped Bronzes in Japan

Sword production in Japan has been attested since the early middle Yayoi period, approximately 300 BC. In northern Kyushu, the late 4th century B.C. (early mid-Yayoi period) saw the emergence of the Korean-style bronze culture, symbolized by bronze mirrors with fine linear design and bronze swords, dagger-axes, and spears.

== See also ==
- Bronze Age Europe
- Håga Kurgan
- Hassle
- Yetholm-type shields
- Iron Age sword
